= Albanian principalities =

Former countries in Europe

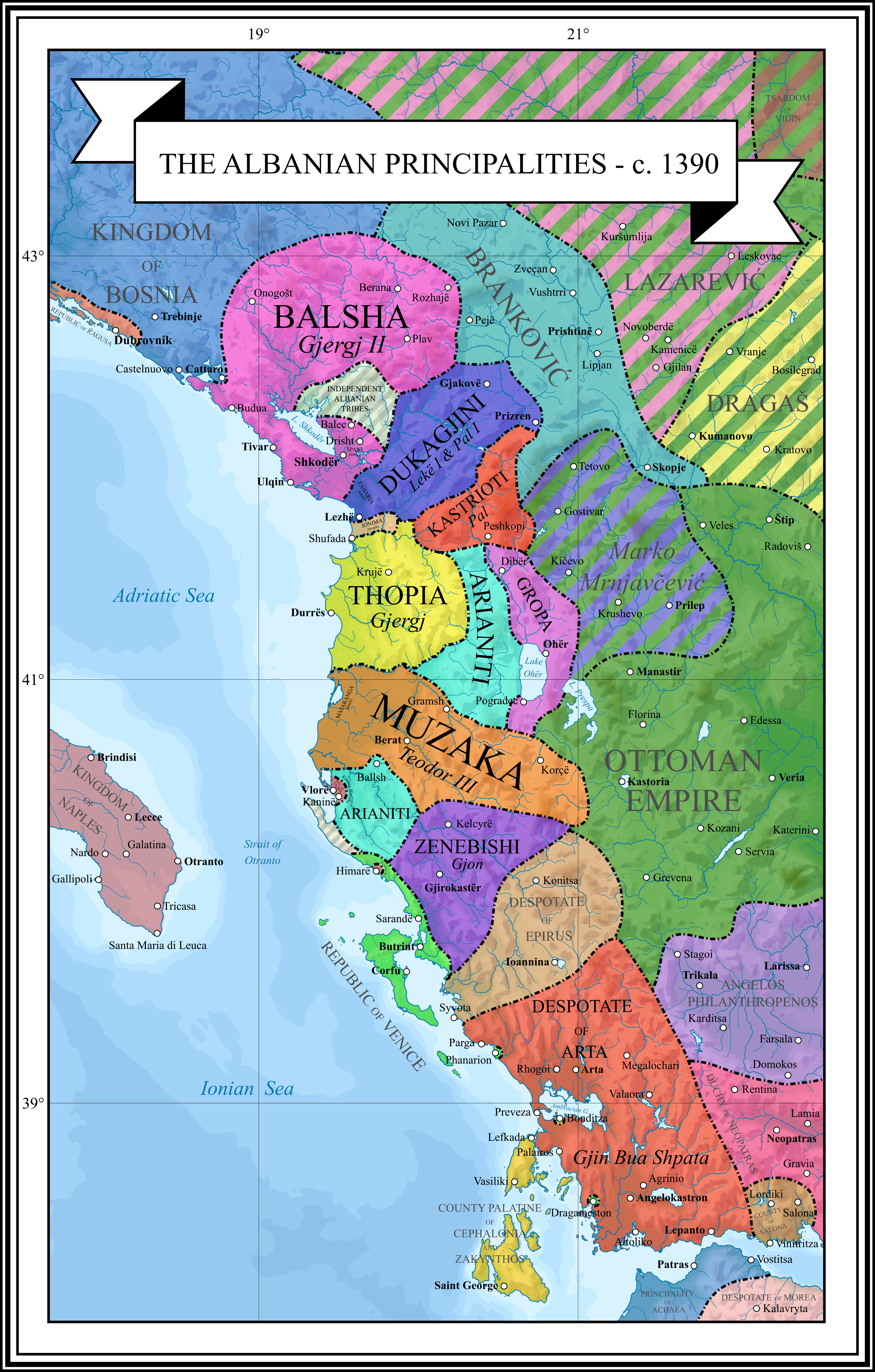
The Albanian principalities, c. 1390.

The term Albanian Principalities refers to a number of principalities (although they functioned more like a series of kingdoms) created in the Middle Ages in Albania and the surrounding regions in the western Balkans that were ruled by Albanian nobility. The 12th century marked the first Albanian principality, the Principality of Arbanon. It was later, however, in the 2nd half of the 14th century that these principalities became stronger, especially with the fall of the Serbian Empire after 1355. Some of these principalities were notably united in 1444 under the military alliance called League of Lezhë up to 1480 which defeated the Ottoman Empire in more than 28 battles. They covered modern day Albania, western and central Kosovo, Epirus, areas up to Corinth, western North Macedonia, southern Montenegro. The leaders of these principalities were some of the most noted Balkan figures in the 14th and 15th centuries such as Gjin Bua Shpata, Andrea II Muzaka, Gjon Zenebishi, Karl Topia, Andrea Gropa, Balsha family, Gjergj Arianiti, Gjon Kastrioti, Skanderbeg, Dukagjini family and Lek Dukagjini.

== List of Albanian principalities ==
- Principality of Arbanon
- Principality of Valona
- Principality of Muzaka
- Despotate of Angelokastron and Lepanto
- Despotate of Arta
- Principality of Balsha
- Principality of Albania (medieval)
- Principality of Gjirokastër
- Principality of Kastrioti
- Principality of Mataranga
- Principality of Dukagjini
- Principality of Gropa
- Principality of Zaharia
- Thopia family domains
- Arianiti family domains

== Principality of Arbanon ==
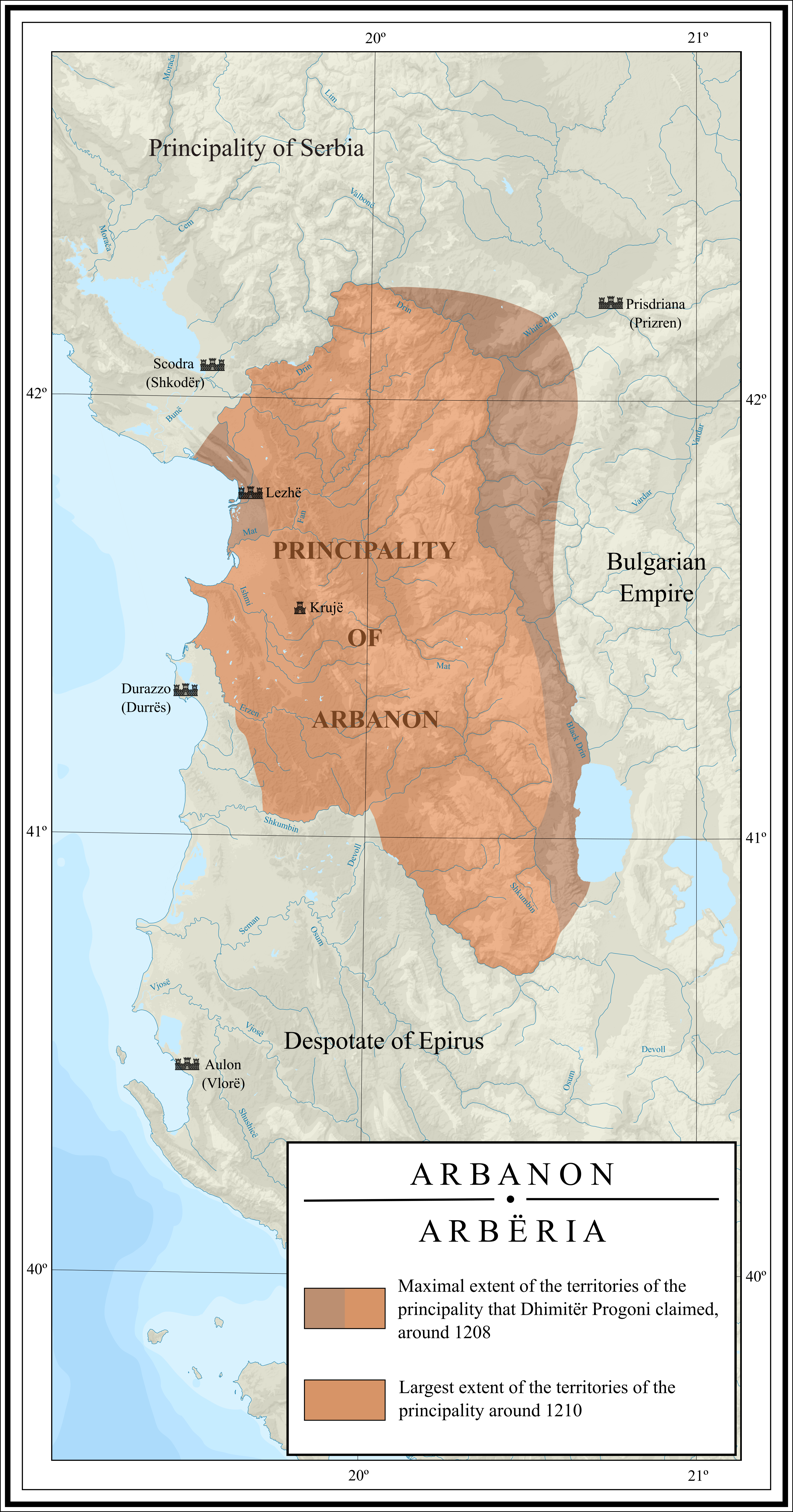
Principality of Arbanon

The Principality of Arbanon (1190–1255) was the first Albanian state during the Middle Ages. The proclamation of the feudal state of Arbanon, in the north of Albania, with Kruja as the capital took place in 1190. As the founder of this state is known Progoni and later on Gjini and Dhimiter. Nderfandina is known as the most important center of this principality. For this was spoken clearly by the emblem of Arbanon found carved on a stone in the Catholic Church of Saint Maria. After the fall of Progon Dynasty the principality came under Grigor Kamona and Gulam of Albania. Finally the principality was dissolved in 1255. The best period of the principality was under Dhimiter Progoni.

== Despotate of Angelokastron and Lepanto ==
Despotate of Angelokastron and Lepanto (1358–1374) was a Despotate, ruled by Albanian chieftains of Epirus. It was created after the defeat of Nikephoros II Orsini in 1358 and ceased to exist in 1374, when its despot, Gjin Bua Shpata, unified the territory with Despotate of Arta.

== Principality of Valona ==
The Principality of Valona (1346–1417) was a medieval state roughly encompassing the territories of the modern Albanian counties of Vlorë (Valona) and Berat. Initially a vassal of the Serbian Empire, it became an independent lordship after 1355 until conquered by the Ottoman Turks in 1417. Between 1355 and 1417, there were Bulgarian rulers from Asen family and rulers from the Balšić family.

== Principality of Dukagjini ==
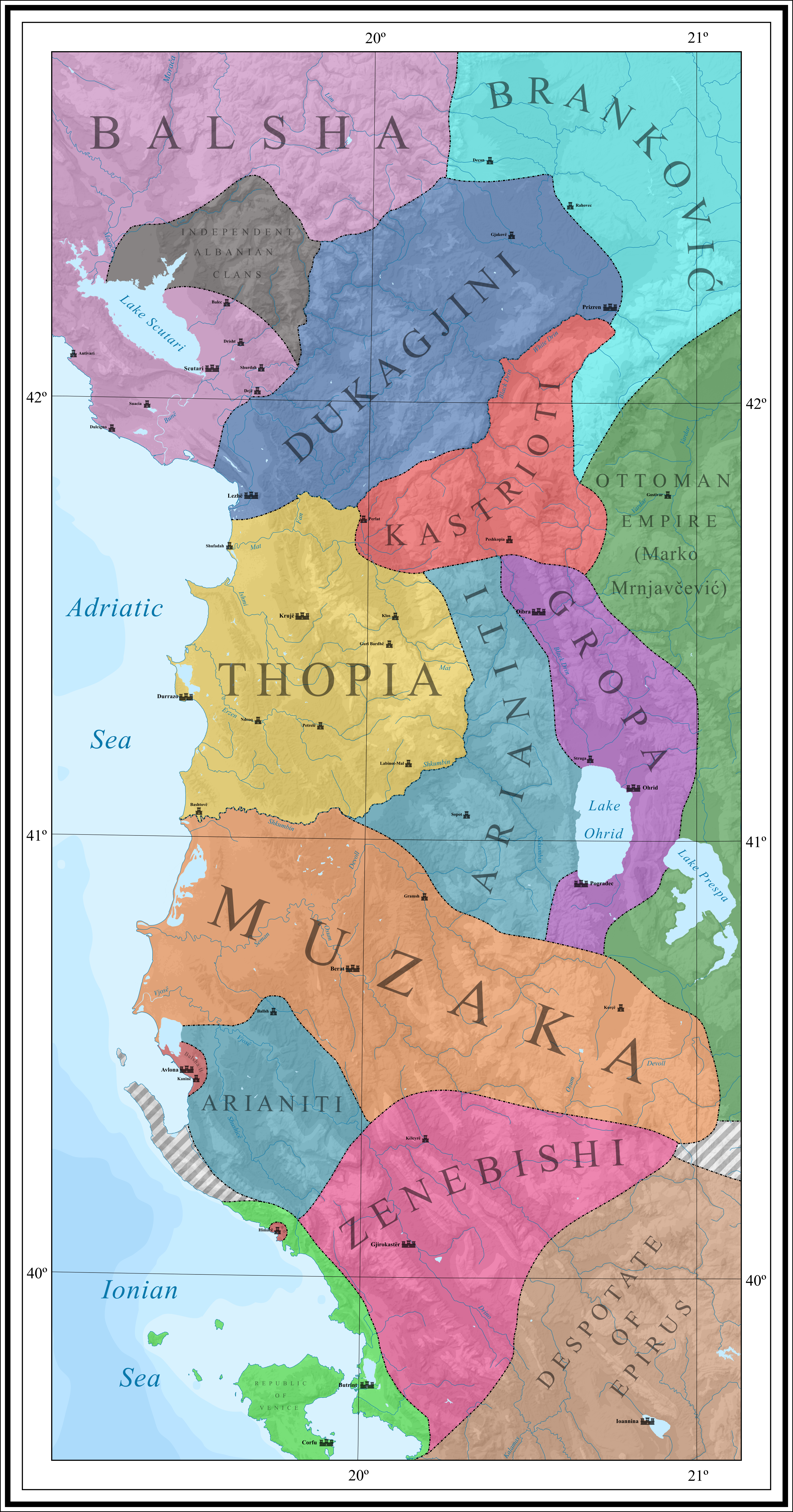
Albanian principalities, over the territory of modern Albania, c. 1390

The Principality of Dukagjini (Albanian: Principata e Dukagjinit) (1387-1444) refers to the domains of the Albanian Dukagjini family in northern Albania and western Kosovo in the 14th century and 15th century. At their maximum extent, the domains of the Dukagjini extended from Upper Zadrima in the northwest to the Plain of Dukagjini in western Kosovo. The political center of the Dukagjini family was Lezhë until 1393 when it was surrendered to Venice in order to not fall under the Ottomans. The Ottoman sanjak of Dukagjin was named after the rule of the family in the areas that formed it. The principality formally existed until 1479, but in 1444 it was united by Skanderbeg with the other Albanian noble families.

== Despotate of Arta ==
Despotate of Arta (1355–1416) was a Despotate, ruled by Albanian chieftains of Epirus. It was created after the defeat of Nikephoros II Orsini in 1358 and ceased to exist in 1416. After the death of Peter Losha in 1374, the Albanian despotates of Arta and Angelocastron were united under the rule of Despot Gjin Bua Shpata. The territory of this despotate was from the Corinth Gulf to Acheron River in the North, neighbouring with the Principality of Gjon Zenebishi, another state created in the area of the Despotate of Epirus. The Despotate of Epirus managed to control in this period only the eastern part of Epirus, with its capital in Ioannina. During this period the Despotate of Epirus was ruled by Thomas II Preljubović, who was in an open conflict with Gjin Bua Shpata. In 1375, Gjin Bua Shpata started an offensive in Ioannina, but he couldn't invade the city. Although Shpata married with the sister of Thomas II Preljubović, Helena their war did not stop. After the death of Gjin Bua Shpata in 1399, the Despotate of Arta weakened continuously. Among the animosities with the rulers of Janina Gjin's successor, Muriq Shpata, had to deal with the intentions of the Venetians and of Count Carlo I Tocco of Cefalonia. In 1416 he defeated Jakup Bua Shpata and conquered Arta, ending the Shpata dynasty.

== Principality of Gjirokastër ==
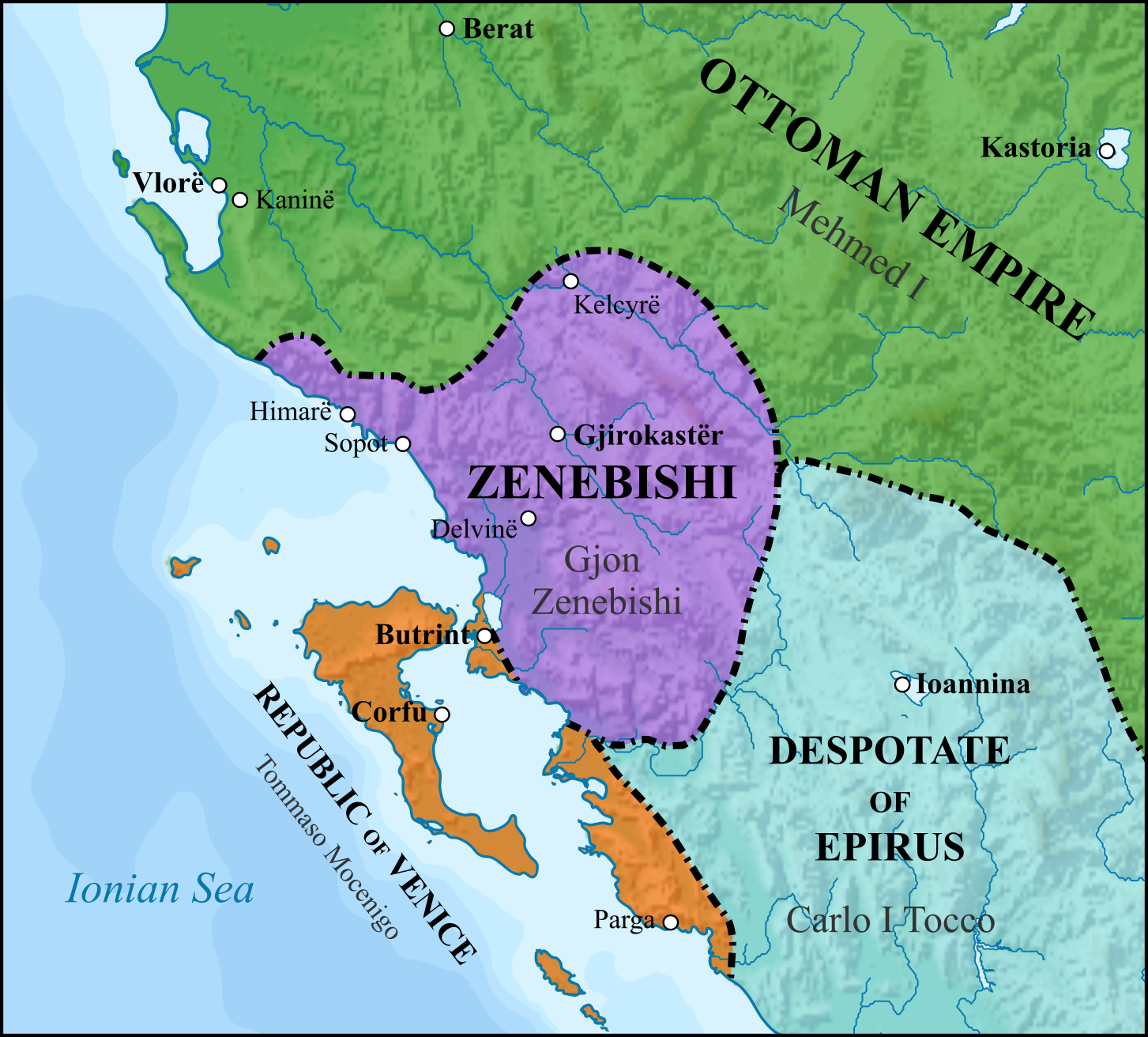
The Principality of the Zenebishi in 1418, prior to the Ottoman conquest.

Principality of Gjirokastër (1373–1418) was a principality created by Gjon Zenebishi in 1386 and abolished after the Ottoman invasion in 1434. In 1380, Gjon Zenebishi was appointed sebastocrator or prefect of Vagenetia near Delvina and in 1386 he became prince. In 1399 Esau, supported by some Albanian clans, marched against his wife's brother-in-law Gjon Zenebishi of Gjirokastër. Now Esau was routed and captured, and much of his land was occupied by Zenebishi. Esau returned to Ioannina in 1400, regaining the reign from Zenebishi. Zenebishi was defeated by the Turks, he fled to the Venetian island of Corfu, but was called back two years later (1416) by an uprising of the mountain tribes. With the support of Venice, he again set his sights on Gjirokastra, but was chased away once more by the Turks and died in Corfu in 1418.

== Lordship of Berat ==
The Lordship of Berat was a principality ruled by the Muzaka noble family. It's uncertain when the Muzaka family started to rule in central Albania, however, one of the first notable rulers is the sebastokrator Andrea I Muzaka who ruled over Myzeqe. In 1335 the principality became a Despotate and was significantly expanded during the rule of Andrea II. The Muzaka family continued to be a formidable and influential dynasty in central Albania until 1417 when it eventually fell under the Ottoman Empire.

== Principality of Kastrioti ==
Principality of Kastrioti (1389–1444) was one of the most important principalities in Medieval Albania. It was created by Gjon Kastrioti and then ruled by the national hero of Albania, Gjergj Kastrioti Skanderbeg. Gjon Kastrioti had originally only two small villages, which probably emblem of the eagle family with a black two-headed, even if it can provide different interpretations. In short time Gjon Kastrioti managed to expand its lands so as to become the undisputed lord of Central Albania. Gjon Kastrioti was among those who opposed the early incursion of Ottoman Bayezid I, however his resistance was ineffectual. The Sultan, having accepted his submissions, obliged him to pay tribute and to ensure the fidelity of local rulers, Gjergj Kastrioti and his three brothers were taken by the Sultan to his court as hostages. Gjergj Kastrioti Skanderbeg was distinguished as one of the best officers in several Ottoman campaigns both in Asia Minor and in Europe, and the Sultan appointed him General. On 28 November 1443, Skanderbeg saw his opportunity to rebel during a battle against the Hungarians led by John Hunyadi in Niš as part of the Crusade of Varna. He switched sides along with 300 other Albanians serving in the Ottoman army. After a long trek to Albania he eventually captured Krujë by forging a letter from the Sultan to the Governor of Krujë, which granted him control of the territory. After capturing the castle, Skanderbeg abjured Islam and proclaimed himself the avenger of his family and country. Following the capture of Krujë, Skanderbeg managed to bring together all the Albanian princes in the town of Lezhë (see League of Lezhë, 1444). Gibbon reports that the "Albanians, a martial race, were unanimous to live and die with their hereditary prince" and that "in the assembly of the states of Epirus, Skanderbeg was elected general of the Turkish war and each of the allies engaged to furnish his respective proportion of men and money".

== Principality of Albania (medieval) under the Thopia ==
The Principality of Albania (1359-1415) was an Albanian principality ruled by the formidable Albanian dynasty of Thopia. One of the first notable rulers is Tanusio Thopia who was count of Mat since 1328. The most influential figure from this dynasty as well one of the most influential figures of medieval Albania was Karl Thopia. The principality changed hands between the Thopia dynasty and the Balšić dynasty, until 1392, when Durrës was annexed by the Republic of Venice.

== Principality of Mataranga ==
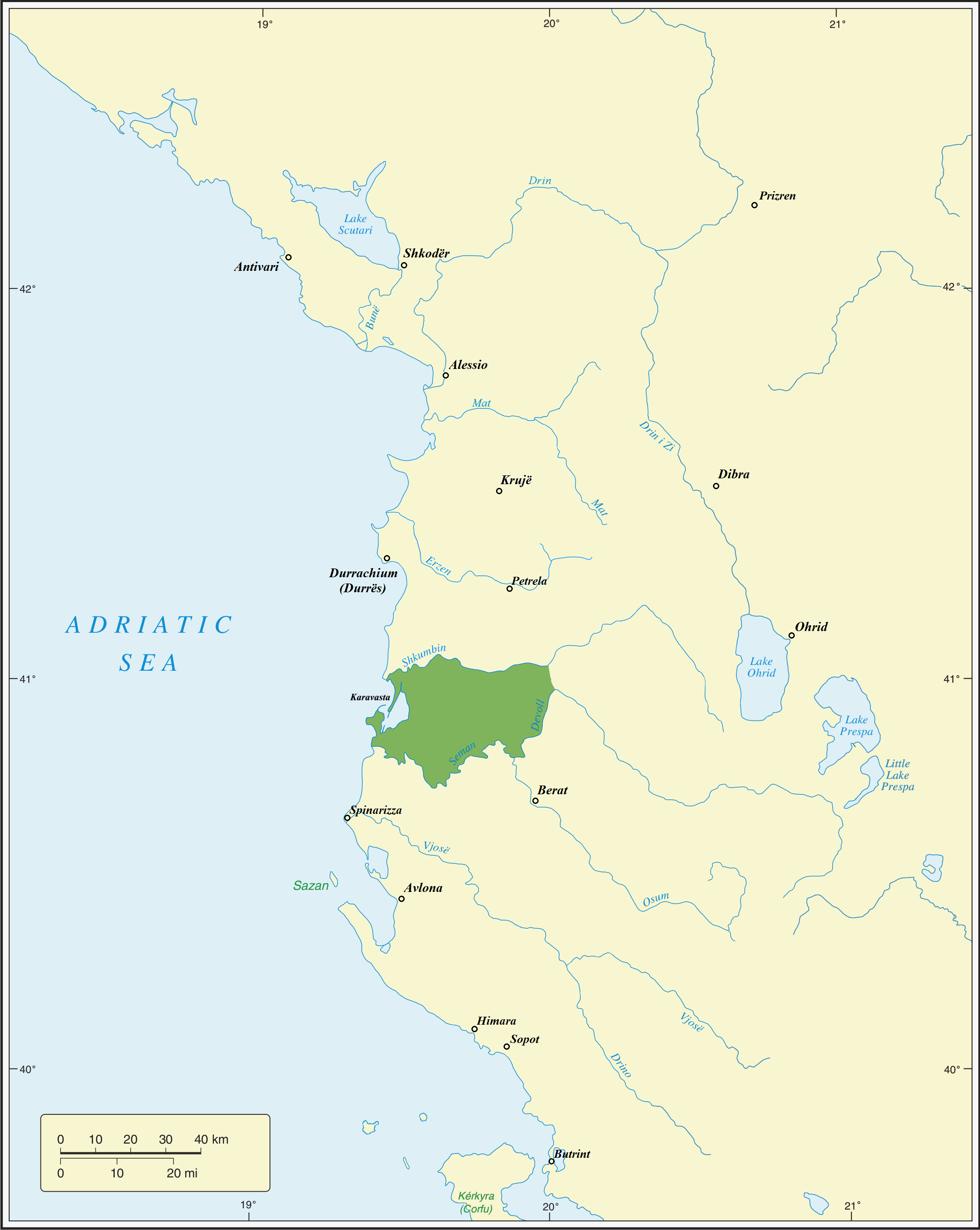
The Principality of Mataranga, ruled by Blasius (between 1358–1367)

The Mataranga family, who were wealthy in the southern Albania coastal region between Durazzo and Valona, whose first known members were recorded in a document from the Republic of Ragusa as rulers of the territory. Temporary vassals of the Byzantine Emperors, at the beginning of the 14th century they accepted the supremacy of Philip of Taranto, who recaptured Durazzo in 1304 for the House of Anjou of the Kingdom of Naples. One of the last members was the ruler Blasius Matarango who after Dusan's death ruled from 1355 until his death in 1367, after his death the territories of the Mataranga family were incorporated into the Principality of Albania.

== Principality of Gropa ==
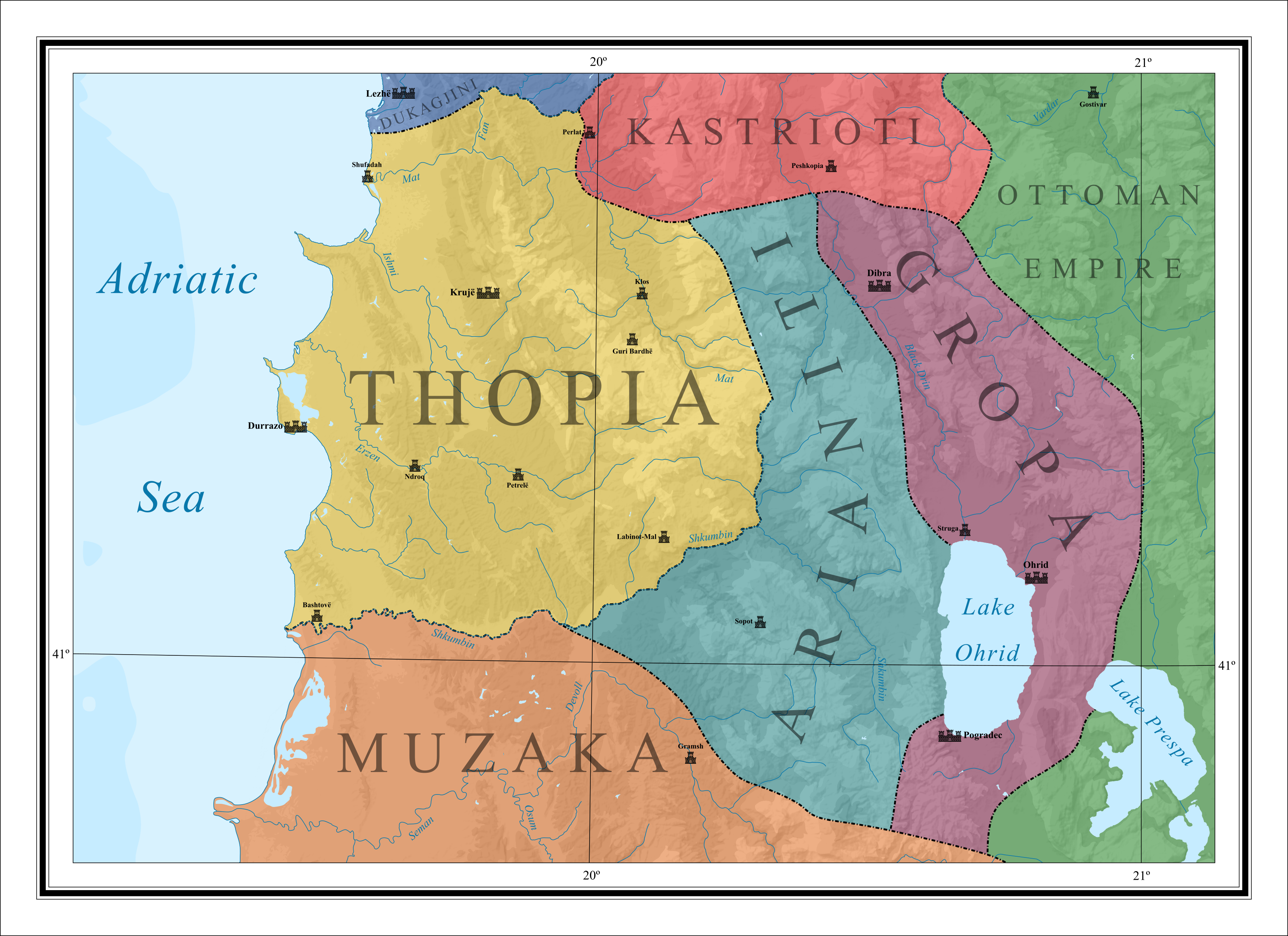
Domains of the Gropaj and Thopia families, 1385-1392.

The Gropa family was one of the biggest and famous Albanian noble families in the eastern Albania. The dynasty controlled the region between Pogradec, Ohrid and Debar in the period 12th – 14th century. In 1218 a certain Andrea was mentioned as a powerful sebast. In 1273 is mentioned Pal Gropa which once again reconfirmed the domains of the Gropa family and were even given extended privileges by Charles I of Anjou in order to ensure his loyalty. The Gropa noble family ruled until 1395 when it fell under the rapid expansion of the Ottoman Empire.

== Principality of Zaharia ==
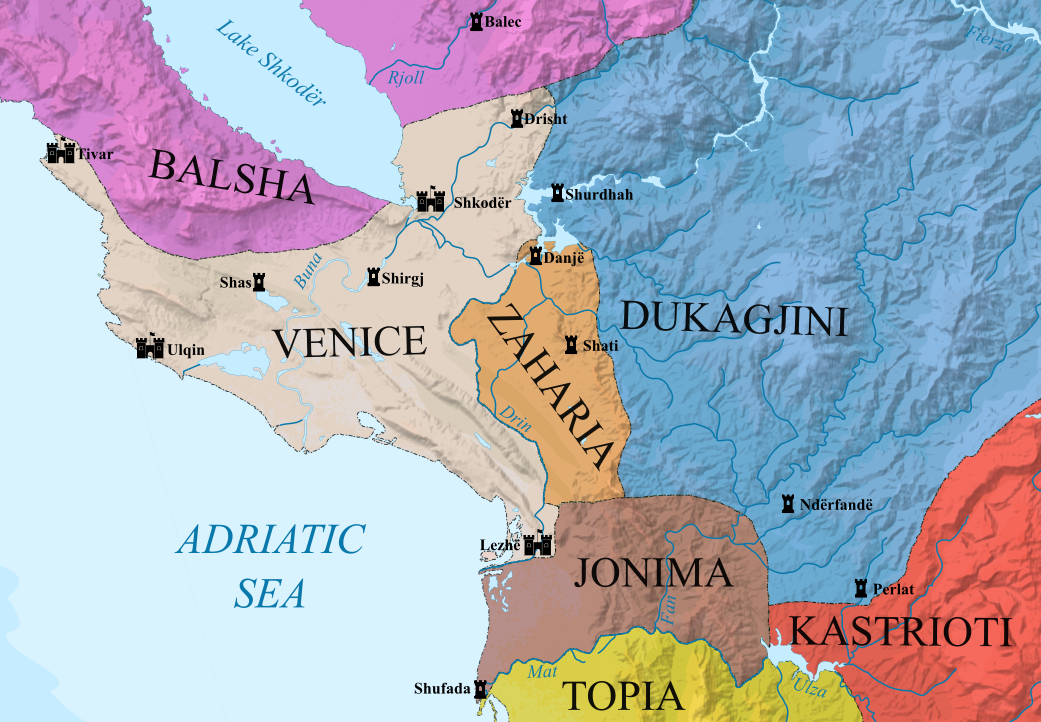
The domains of the Jonima and Zaharia, c. 1406.

The first ruler of the Zaharia dynasty was Koja Zaharia who captured the castle of Dagnum in 1396 he proclaimed himself the Lord of Sati and Dagnum ("dominus Sabatensis et Dagnensis") and from there he ruled the territory around it as an Ottoman vassal. In October 1400 Koja proposed to the Venetians to simulate a battle in which he and his cousin Dhimitër Jonima would pretend to lose their possessions to the Venetians, in exchange for provision of 500 ducats annually. The Venetians did not promptly respond and Koja returned to the sultan. Koja continued to rule until 1430 when Ishak Bey captured Dagnum from Koja Zaharia in 1430 it was attached to the territory controlled by Ali Beg, while Koja was either imprisoned or expelled. After the Albanian Revolt of 1432–1436 was crushed the sultan entrusted Koja's son Lekë Zaharia with a position of Dagnum's governor.

== See also ==
- Principality of Albania
- List of Albanian monarchs

== Sources ==
- Ducellier, Alain (1999), "Albania, Serbia and Bulgaria", in Abulafia, David (ed.), The New Cambridge Medieval History, Volume V: c. 1198-c. 1300, Cambridge University Press, pp. 779–795, ISBN 0-521-36289-X

== Bibliography ==
- Bešić, Zarij M. (1970), Istorija Crne Gore / 2. Crna gora u doba oblasnih gospodara (in Serbian), Titograd: Redakcija za istoiju Crne Gore, OCLC 175122851
- Imber, Colin (2019). The Ottoman Empire, 1300-1650: The Structure of Power. Macmillan International Higher Education. ISBN 978-1352004144.
- Trnavci, Gene (2010). Mortimer Sellers (ed.). The interaction of customary law with the modern rule of law in Albania and Kosova. Springer. p. 205. ISBN 978-9048137497.
- "History of Albanian People" Albanian Academy of Science. ISBN 99927-1-623-1
- The American Slavic and East European Review 1952. 1952. ASIN 1258092352.
