= Principality of Dukagjini =

Medieval Albanian Principality

Principality of Dukagjini Principata e Dukagjinit (Albanian)
- 1387–1479
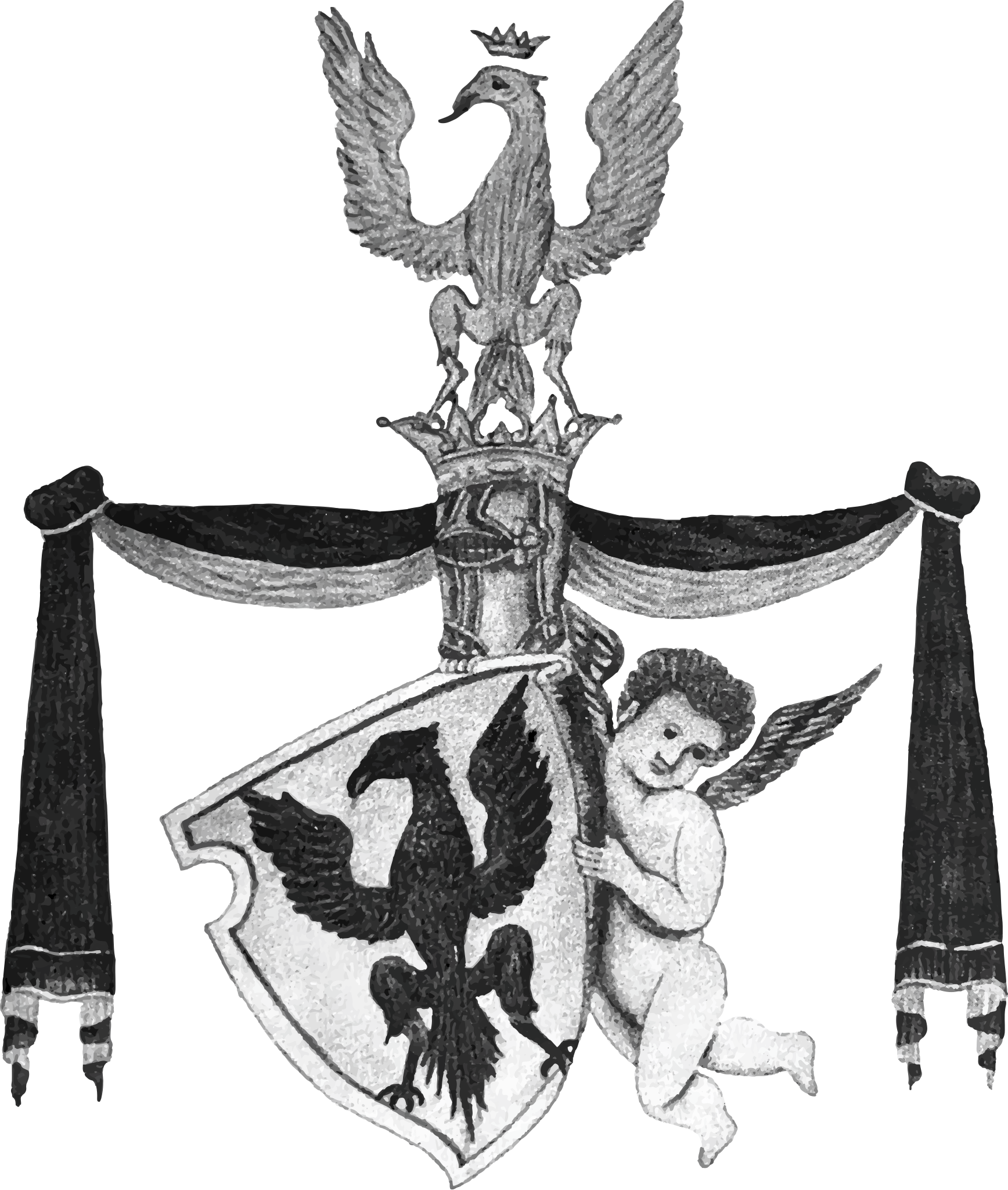
- Coat of Arms

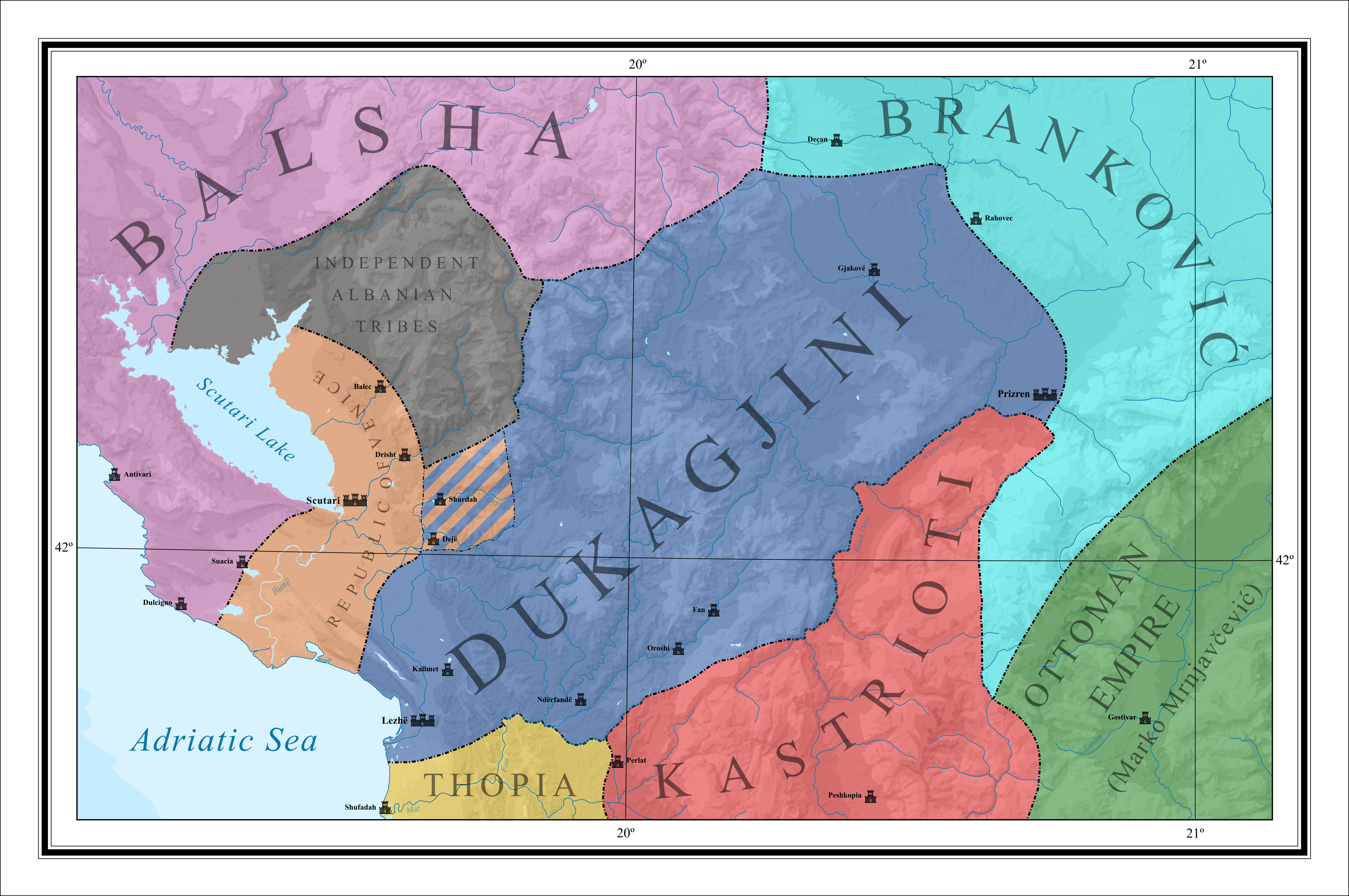
- Lands of the Dukagjini between 1387-1393
- Status: Principality
- Capital: Lezhë; Ulpiana
- Common languages: Albanian
- Religion: Catholicism
- Prince/Lord
  - 1387–1393, 1387–?: Pal I Dukagjini, Lekë I Dukagjini
  - 1393–1413: Little Tanush
  - 1413–1446: Pal II Dukagjini
  - 1446–1479: Lekë III Dukagjini
- Historical era: Medieval
  - Established: 1387
  - Disestablished: 1479
Preceded by
Zeta under the Balšići
Succeeded by
League of Lezhë
Sanjak of Scutari
Sanjak of İpek
- Today part of: Albania; Kosovo

The Principality of Dukagjini (Albanian: Principata e Dukagjinit) refers to the domains (zotërimet) of the Albanian Dukagjini family in northern Albania and western part of the modern-day territory of Kosovo in the 14th century and 15th century. At their maximum extent, the domains of the Dukagjini extended from Upper Zadrima in the northwest to the Plain of Dukagjini in western Kosovo. The political center of the Dukagjini family was Lezhë until 1393 when it was surrendered to Venice in order to not fall under the Ottomans. The Ottoman sanjak of Dukagjin was named after the rule of the family in the areas that formed it.

The Dukagjini family appears for the first time in historical record in 1281, when their progenitor Gjin Tanushi took the title of dux. They may have been descendants of the earlier Progoni family which roughly claimed the same territory as they. The Dukagjini formed their independent domains when they rebelled against the Balšić noble family. This event must have happened by 1387, because that year the brothers Pal and Lekë Dukagjini signed a trade agreement with the Republic of Ragusa and allowed free passage to the republic's merchants through their territories. It was later ruled by Pal's descendants, Tanush Dukagjini, and Pal Dukagjini II. In June 1393, the two Dukagjini brothers ceded it to Venice, which it kept until 1478 despite later attempts by the family to retake the city. The difficult to access mountainous hinterland in the east remained under the control of the Dukagjini. In 1398, Little Tanush (son of Pal I), surrendered to the Ottomans, but in 1402, after their defeat at Ankara and the capture of Sultan Bayezid I, he freed himself from them. After the reign of Little Tanush, the Principality of Dukagjini fell to the hands of Pal II who participated in an Albanian revolt against the Ottomas. Sometime after the revolt, the Dukagjini became the vassals of the Zaharia. As their vassals, Pal Dukagjini together with Nicholas and Lekë III Dukagjini (referred to simply as Lekë Dukagjini) took part in the League of Lezhë in 1444. The Principality of Dukagjini was liberated from the Zaharia after the assassination of Lekë Zaharia by either Nicholas or Lekë Dukagjini. Under Lekë, the principality found itself in a conflict with Venice which ended in 1457. After the death of Skanderbeg, Lekë became the leader of the League of Lezhë, continuing the resistance against the Ottoman Empire until 1479 when the league was defeated. With the defeat of the League of Lezhë, the Principality of Dukagjini also fell.

== Lands ==
The dominion of the Principality included much of Northern Albania and the Dukagjini plain. The Dukagjini borders were altered several times throughout the 14th and 15 centuries. At their height, the Dukagjini ruled an area that stretched from Upper Zadrima to Western Kosovo. The epicenter of the Principality was the city of Alessio (modern day Lezhë). Another important city under the control of the Dukagjini was the city of Prizren, with their presence there being documented by Albanian humanist Marin Barleti. Their all-time lands stretched from Alessio in the south to Peja in the north and from Dagnum in the west to Prizren in the east. It is also speculated that the Dukagjini may have stretched east to Ulpiana, the ancient town near modern-day Pristina, with it serving as a secondary capital.

== History ==
=== Early History ===
The Dukagjini family, thought to be related to the older Progoni family of Arbanon, appear for the first time in 1281, when their progenitor Gjin Tanushi was given the title of dux. The family rose to prominence after a rebellion against the Balshaj, from whom they gained independence under the leadership of the brothers Pal and Lekë. The rebellion is thought to have happened in the year of 1387 when a trade agreement with the Republic of Ragusa was signed. The agreement allowed Ragusan merchants to pass freely through the Dukagjini lands.

=== Reign of Little Tanush ===
After the death of Pal I Dukagjini in 1393, the seat of the Principality of Dukagjini was given to Little Tanush, who in 1398 surrendered his lands to the Ottoman Empire. However, after the Ottoman defeat at the Battle of Ankara in 1402 and the capture of sultan Bayezid I, Little Tanush freed himself together with the Dukagjini territory.

During the Second Scutari War, the Dukagjini were allies with the Serbian Despotate and Zeta, despite several Venetians attempts of bribery. In 1419, the Venetians attempted to bribe the Dukagjinis and Kastriotis to attack Zeta, but it seems without success. In January 1423, the Venetians once again attempted to bribe the Dukagjini, for they had already bribed the Pamaliots on Buna, however it was unsuccessful. Admiral Francesco Bembo once again attempted to bribe them in April 1423 with no success. Despite not joining the Venetians as planned, the Albanian nobles left the ranks of Lazarević's army, thus becoming a potential danger to him. In 1429, the Dukagjini under the leadership of Little Tanush accompanied Stefan Maramonte in his plundering of the regions of Ulqin and Scutari. Little Tanush also accompanied Maramonte in his unsuccessful attack on Drivast the same year. In April 1429 the Dukagjini received 120 perpers from Ragusa.

=== Reign of Pall II ===
After Little Tanushes death some time before 1433, Pal Dukagjini became the new Prince of Dukagjin. Pal and his kingsman Nicholas Dukagjini played a crucial role in the geo-politics of Albania. Nicholas participated in the Albanian revolt of 1432–1436, led by Gjergj Arianiti. The forces of the Principality besieged and captured the fortress of Dagnum before abruptly yielding it to Venice. However, unwilling to provoke the Ottoman Empire, the Venetians returned Dagnum to the Ottoman Empire.

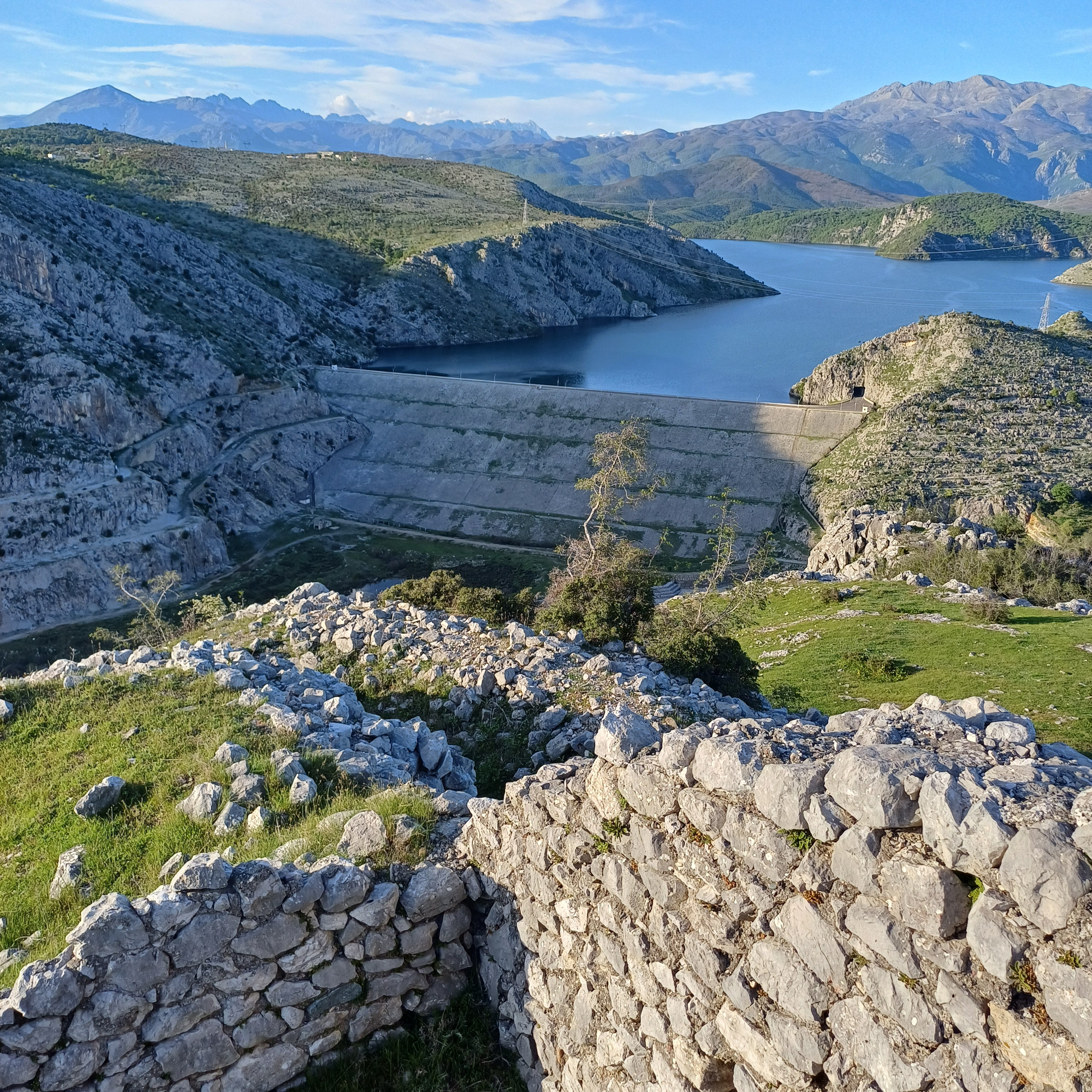
Ruined walls of Dagnum

Sometime during the reign of Pal II, the Principality of Dukagjini became a vassal of Lekë Zaharia, lord of Sati and Dagnum. The Dukagjini and Zaharia houses had enjoyed a long period of alliances and marriages due to their geographical proximity. The wife of Koja Zaharia, Bosa Dukagjini herself was a Dukagjini. Together with Lekë Zaharia, Pal and Nicholas joined Skanderbeg's League of Lezhë in 1444.

=== Reign of Lekë III ===
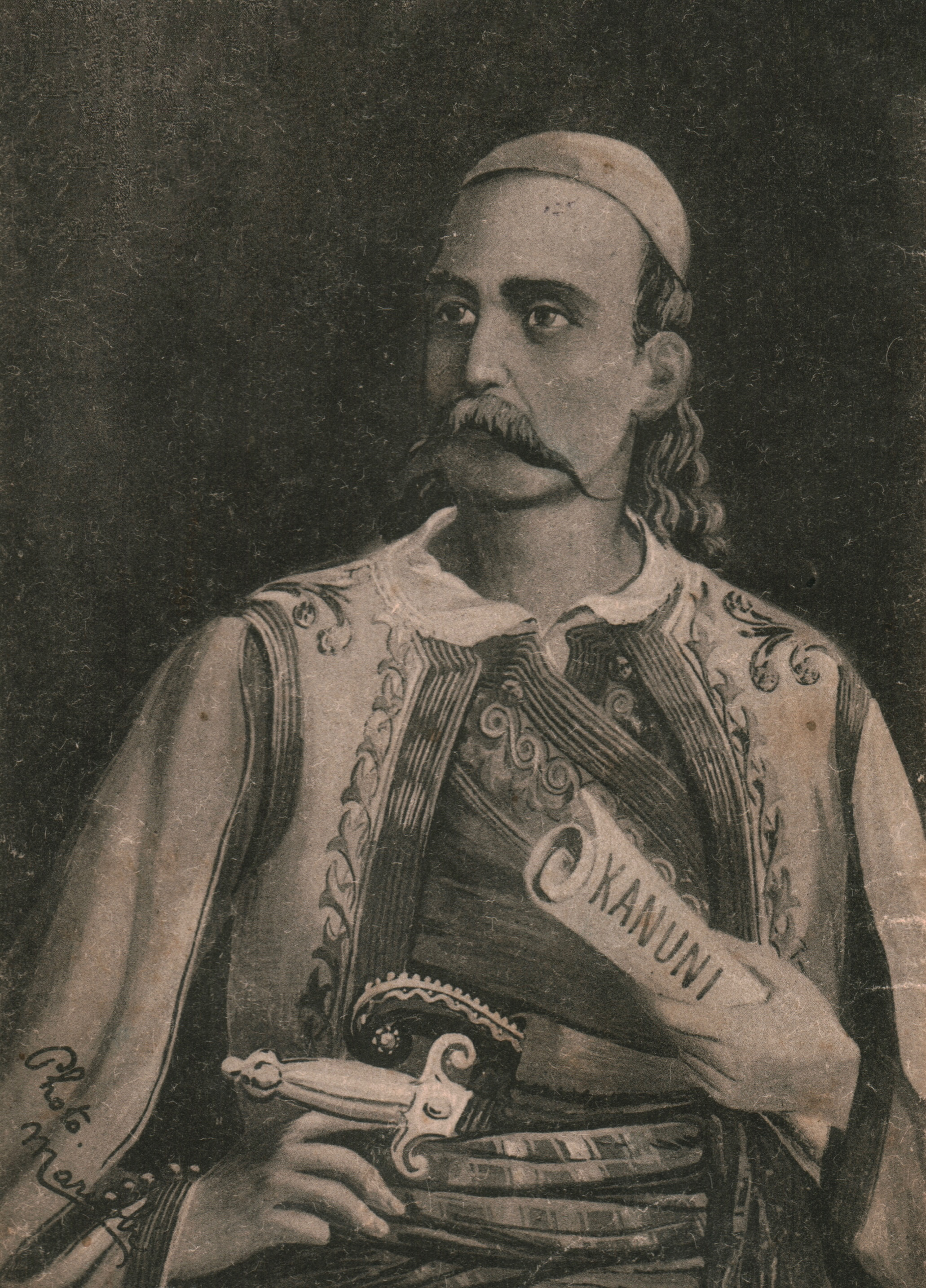
Lekë Dukagjini

Lekë III, referred to as Lekë Dukagjini, became Prince of Dukagjin in 1446 after the murder of Lekë Zaharia. Despite his father, Pal II living until 1458, he is thought to have become a vassal of Venice, while the Principality remained independent under Leka III. The Principality of Dukagjin was reformed after a conflict between Lekë Dukagjini and Lekë Zaharia between 1445–1447. The conflict began at the wedding of Mamica Kastrioti, the sister of Skanderbeg. During the wedding, Lekë Dukagjini asked Irene Dushmani, princess of Zadrima and Pult, for her hand in marriage. A drunken Lekë Zaharia, also wanting the princess's hand in marriage, assaulted Dukagjini. The ensuing battle led to the deaths of 105 soldiers from both sides. In an act of revenge, Lekë Dukagjini ambushed and killed Zaharia in 1447, though some sources mention Nicholas Dukagjini as the perpetrator of the assassination.

==== Conflict with Venice ====
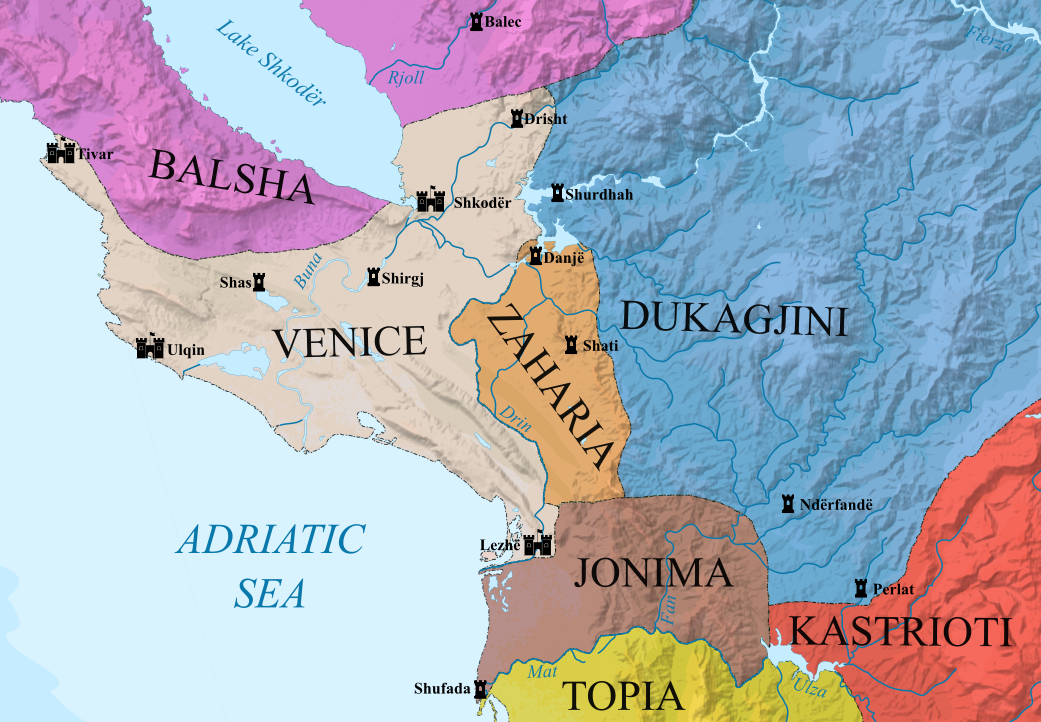
Northern Albania in 1406

The death of Zaharia sparked a broader conflict between the League of Lezhë and the Venetians. His death left the Zaharia princedom with no successor, leading to his mother giving Dagnum, Sati, Gladri and Dushmani to the Venetians. Skanderbeg, claiming these places as territory of the League, began a war with Venetians. Peace was signed between the Venetians and Skanderbeg on 4 October 1448 in Alessio. Dagnum remained in Venetian hands while in return the Venetians agreed that Skanderbeg would receive an annual pension of 1,400 ducats together with an annual tax exemption for 200 horse loads of salt from Durazzo. Nevertheless, the conflict between the Principality of Dukagjini and Venice continued. In 1456, the Dukagjini defeated the Venetians and captured Dagnum, however a year later, bolstered by the support of Skanderbeg, the Venetians retook the fortress and Lekë Dukagjini signed for peace a year later. The Dukagjini Principality continued to hold the surroundings of Sati, however after taking it from the Ottomans in 1459, Skanderbeg, wishing to give the fortress to the Venetians, attacked the Dukagjini forces and pushed them out of the area.

==== Resistance against the Ottomans and final years ====
The Dukagjini Principality rejoined the League of Lezhë in the final years of Skanderbeg's rebellion. After Skanderbeg's death in 1468, the Balshaj and Dukagjini continued the fight against the Ottomans for Venice. After the fall of Krujë in 1478 and the fall of Shkodër in 1479 the League of Lezhë was dissolved, with the Ottomans conquering most of the Albanian lands. The Principality was heavily damaged during this period. Dagnum, as well as its surroundings, were completely destroyed by the Ottomans. After the fall of the League of Lezhë, the Dukagjini nobles, including Lekë, fled Albania, marking the fall of the Principality of Dukagjini, the lands of which were later incorporated into the Sanjak of Scutari.

== Monarchs ==
Throughout its history, the Principality of Dukagjini had 5 monarchs. Throughout certain periods, such as the reigns of Leka I and Pal I, the Principality appears to have had a dualist monarch system.

Picture	Name	Reign	Notes
	^{Prince of Dukagjini; Lord of Lezhë} Pal I Dukagjini,	1387–1393	Pal I Dukagjini's rule in 1387 marked a significant period in the formation of the Principality of Dukagjini. As one of the main branches of the Dukagjini family, Pal I and his brother Lekë were described as owners of Lezhë in a Ragusan document from that year. Their role in securing a free pass to Ragusan merchants in their dominion hinted at their emerging influence.
	^{Prince of Dukagjini; Lord of Lezhë} Lek I Dukagjini	1387–????	Lekë I Dukagjini, the brother of Pal I Dukagjini, played a crucial role in the 14th-century Principality of Dukagjini. As part of the Dukagjini family, Lekë and his brother were prominent figures in the late 13th century. The Dukagjini family evolved from an extended clan to a feudal family, and Lekë's contributions included being an owner of Lezhë.
	^{Prince of Dukagjini} Little Tanush	1393–1413	He was the son of Pal Dukagjini, a prominent figure in the family. Tanush, along with his brothers, played a role in the complex political landscape of the time.
	^{Prince of Dukagjini} Pal II Dukagjini	1413–1446	Pal II Dukagjini, a prominent member of the Dukagjini family, was an Albanian nobleman who, along with his kinsman Nicholas Dukagjini, initially served under Venetian vassal Lekë Zaharia. Actively involved in the League of Lezhë, a 1444 alliance against Ottoman rule, Pal later accepted vassalage under Alfonso V of Aragon in 1454. However, he eventually abandoned Skanderbeg's forces and joined the Ottomans. Pal left a lasting impact with four notable sons, including Nicholas and Lekë, who continued to shape the political landscape of the region.
	^{Prince of Dukagjini} Lekë Dukagjini	1446–1479	Known for the Kanuni i Lekë Dukagjinit, a legal code observed in northern Albanian tribes, Lekë succeeded his father Pal II Dukagjini in 1446. His principality, stretching from Northern Albania into modern Kosovo, was a key player in the region. Lekë participated in Skanderbeg's military efforts against the Ottoman Empire, but internal conflicts among Albanian nobles were not uncommon during this tumultuous period. Lekë Dukagjini's involvement in hostilities, including the death of Lekë Zaharia, highlighted the complex dynamics. His principality faced challenges, and after Skanderbeg's death, Lekë continued resistance against the Ottomans until 1479, occasionally collaborating with the Venetians.

== Bibliography ==
- Imber, Colin (2019). The Ottoman Empire, 1300-1650: The Structure of Power. Macmillan International Higher Education. ISBN 978-1352004144.
- Malaj, Edmond (2016). "The Noble Dukagjinis during the Middle Ages. Their Territories and some Characteristics". Studime Historike. 1–2: 10.
- Fine, John Van Antwerp (1994), The Late Medieval Balkans: A Critical Survey from the Late Twelfth Century to the Ottoman Conquest, University of Michigan Press, ISBN 978-0-472-08260-5
- Trnavci, Gene (2010). Mortimer Sellers (ed.). The interaction of customary law with the modern rule of law in Albania and Kosova. Springer. p. 205. ISBN 978-9048137497.
- Zamputi, Injac (1984). "Rindërtimi i mbishkrimit të Arbërit dhe mundësitë e reja për leximin e tij / La reconstruction de l'inscription de l'Arbër et les nouvelles possibilités qui s'offrent pour sa lecture". Ilira. 14 (2).
- Sellers, Mortimer; Tomaszewski, Tadeusz (2010). The Rule of Law in Comparative Perspective. ISBN 9789048137497.
- Ćorović, Vladimir (2014). Istorija srpskog naroda. eBook Portal. GGKEY:XPENWQLDTZF.
- Vujović, Dimitrije; Dragićević, Risto; Đakonović, Nikola; Đurović, Milinko; Đurović, Mirčeta; Mijović, Pavle; Pejović, Đoko; Strugar, Vlado (1970). Milinko Đurović (ed.). Istorija Crne Gore [History of Montenegro] (in Serbian). Vol. II. Titograd: Naučno Delo. OCLC 633018773.
- Anamali, Skënder (2002). Historia e popullit shqiptar I, Mesjeta [The history of the Albanian people I, Middle ages]. Toena. ISBN 9789992716229. OCLC 52411919.
- Noli, Fan Stilian (1947). George Castrioti Scanderbeg (1405–1468). International Universities Press. OCLC 732882.
- Schmitt, Oliver Jens (2001), Das venezianische Albanien (1392-1479), München: R. Oldenbourg Verlag GmbH München, ISBN 3-486-56569--9
- Božić, Ivan (1979). Nemirno pomorje XV veka (in Serbian). Beograd: Srpska književna zadruga. OCLC 5845972.
