= Zaharia family =

Albanian noble family

Zaharia family Familja Zahariajt Zakarija, Zakaria, Zacharia, Zaccaria
- Noble family
- Country: Medieval Albania (Zaharia Domains)
- Current region: Northern Albania; Venetian Albania
- Origin: Budua & Danjë
- Founded: 14th century
- Founder: Nikollë Zaharia
- Current head: Extinct
- Final ruler: Lekë Zaharia
- Final head: Bosa Dukagjini
- Historic seat: Danjë & Shati
- Titles: Lord of Budua; Lord of Danjë; Lord of Shati
- Members: Nikollë Zaharia; Koja Zaharia; Lekë Zaharia; Boglia Zaharia; Pjetër Zaharia
- Connected families: Dukagjini family (by marriage); Balsha family (by marriage)
- Estates: Budua, Danjë, Shati, Gladri and Dushmani
- Dissolution: 15th century
- Deposition: 1445
- The family became extinct in the mid-15th century after the death of Lekë Zaharia and the surrender of Danjë to the Republic of Venice.

The Zaharia family, also known as the Zakarija, Zakaria, Zacharia or Zaccaria was an Albanian noble family, most prominent during the 14th and 15th century.

== History ==
=== Nikollë Zaharia ===
The Zaharia family is mentioned for the first time in the 14th century. A certain Nicholas Zakarija is first mentioned in 1385 as a Balšić family commander and governor of Budva in 1363. After more than twenty years of loyalty, Nicholas Zakarija revolted in 1386 and became ruler of Budva. However, by 1389 Đurađ II Balšić had recaptured the city.

The name of Nicholas Zaharia appears in the form of Nikola Sakat in many original Venetian and Ragusan documents (as governor of Budva in 1383, influential person in Zeta in 1386 and lord of Dagnum during a period of cooperation with Balšić family). That is a basis for some concluding that that Nicholas Zaharia and Nikola Sakat are the same person, who is related to Koja Zaharia.

Komnen Arianiti of Arianiti family married the daughter of Nicholas Zaharia Sakati, ruler of Budva. They had three sons (Gjergj, Muzaka, and Vladan), and one daughter who married Pal Dukagjini.

=== Koja Zaharia ===
In 1396, due to a favorable political situation, Koja Zaharija captured the castle of Dagnum and declared himself a vassal of the Ottomans. In 1412 or at the beginning of 1413, in his second marriage, Balša III married Bolja, a daughter of Koja Zaharia. In 1415 their only son and the only male descendant of the Balša family died. Koja maintained the control of the region until his death.

=== Lekë Zaharia ===
Upon the death of Koja Zaharija, control of the region was passed to his only son, Lekë Zaharia. According to Marin Barleti, in 1445, during the wedding ceremony of Skanderbeg's sister Mamica Kastrioti, Lekë Zaharia had a dispute with Lekë Dukagjini. The reason of this dispute was a woman named Irene Dushmani, the heir of Dushmani family. She seemed to prefer Zaharia, while this was not accepted by Dukagjini. A skirmish happened and Lekë Dukagjini remained wounded, saved only by the intervention of Vrana Konti. Two years later, in 1447, Lekë Zaharia was killed in an ambush and Lekë Dukagjini was accused of this murder.

Original Venetian documents show that this murder happened in 1444. According to Venetian chronicler Stefano Magno, it was Nicholas Dukagjin, Zaharia's vassal, who killed Lekë Zaharia in battle, not Lekë Dukagjin, as stated by Marin Barleti. Stefano Magno also stated that, before he died, Lekë Zaharia expressed the wish that his properties should be handed over to Venetian Republic.

=== Bosa Dukagjini ===
Bosa Dukagjini, the mother of Lekë Zaharia, died in the fire which devastated Venetian Scutari in October 1448.

=== After the extinction of the family ===
Having left no heirs, the fortress of Dagnum was claimed by Skanderbeg in the name of League of Lezhë, in which Lekë Zaharia had been a participant. However, his mother surrendered the castle to the Venice Republic. This events triggered the two-year-long Albanian–Venetian War (1447–1448). In the end the castle of Dagnum remained in Venetian hands toward an annual tribute to Skanderbeg.

=== Religious affiliation ===
According to Eqrem Vlora, some members of the Zaharia family were initially Eastern Orthodox Christians, only converting to Roman Catholicism in 1414, after which they disappeared from history.

== Family tree ==
- Nikollë Zaharia, Lord of Budua, unknown spouse
  - Unknown Daughter, married Komnen Arianiti
    - Gjergj Arianiti
    - Muzakë Arianiti
    - Vladan Arianiti
  - Koja Zaharia, Lord of Sati and Dagnum, married Bosa Dukagjini
    - Lekë Zaharia, Lord of Sati and Dagnum, married Irene Dushmani
    - Boglia Zaharia, Lady of Zeta, married Balsha III
      - Teodora Balsha, married Petar Vojsalić Hrvatinić who was a Duke of Bosnia
        - Dorothea Vojsalić
      - Unnamed Son, was born in 1415 but died shortly after birth
    - Busha Zaharia, Lady of Paštrovići, married Đurađ Đurašević
      - Đurašin Đurašević
      - Gojčin Crnojević, Lord of Zeta, unknown spouse
        - Aleksandar Crnojević
      - Stefan Crnojević, Lord of Zeta, married Mara Kastrioti
        - Ivan Crnojević, Lord of Zeta, married Goisava Arianiti then Mara Vukčić Kosača
        - Andrija Crnojević
        - Božidar Crnojević
      - Unknown Son

== See also ==
- Pjetër Zaharia (13??–1414), member of the family, bishop of the Roman Catholic Diocese of Sapë and of Dagnum.

== Bibliography ==
- Albanološki institut u Prištini (1968), Gjurmime albanologjike [Albanological Research], Volumes 7-8 (in Serbian), Priština: Filozofski fakultet u Prištini. Katedra za albanologiju
- Anamali, Skënder (2002), Historia e popullit shqiptar në katër vëllime [The history of the Albanian people in four volumes] (in Albanian), vol. I, Botimet Toena, OCLC 52411919
- Božić, Ivan (1979), Nemirno pomorje XV veka [The Troubled Seas of the 15th Century] (in Serbian), Beograd: Srpska književna zadruga, OCLC 5845972
- Fine, John Van Antwerp Jr. (1994) [1987]. The Late Medieval Balkans: A Critical Survey from the Late Twelfth Century to the Ottoman Conquest. Ann Arbor, Michigan: University of Michigan Press. p. 392. ISBN 0-472-08260-4.
- Noli, Fan Stylian (1967). "Gjergj Kastrioti Skënderbeu, 1405-1468 [Skanderbeg (1405-1468)]". Vepra të plota [Complete Works] (in Albanian). Vol. 4. Naim Frashëri Publishing House. pp. 90–92.
- Schmitt, Oliver Jens (2001), Das venezianische Albanien (1392-1479) [Venetian Albania (1392-1479)], München: R. Oldenbourg Verlag, ISBN 3-486-56569--9 Text not available online as of August 2021.
- Spremić, Momčilo (2004), Ćulibrk, Jovan (ed.), Crkvene prilike u Zeti u doba Nikona Jerusalimca [The Situation of the Church in Zeta in the Time of Nikon of Jerusalem] (in Serbian), Cetinje, Belgrade: Svetigora, Publikum, pp. 73–108
- Vlora, Ekrem Bey (1956). Robert Elsie (ed.). "The Ruling Families of Albania in the pre-Ottoman Period". Archived from the original on 27 January 2012.
