= Nikollë Zaharia =

- Lord of Budua; Castellan and Vojvod of Budua

Castellan and Vojvod of Budua
- Reign: 1364-1388
- Predecessor: Površka
- Successor: Gjergj II Balsha

Lord of Budua
- Reign: 1386-1388/1389
- Successor: Gjergj II Balsha
- Died: c. 1388
- Spouse: Unknown
- Issue: Koja Zaharia; Unknown Daughter
- House: Zaharia family

Nikollë Zaharia, also known as Nikola Zakarija or Nikola Sakat (fl. 1364–1388), was a 14th-century Albanian nobleman of the Zaharia family who served as the castellan of Budva under the Balsha family. He was a prominent figure in the political affairs of the southern Adriatic, holding Ragusan and Venetian citizenship, and at times acting as an ally or adversary in their conflicts with each other as well as Kotor and King Tvrtko I of Bosnia. Following the death of Balsha II in 1385, Zaharia sought independence from Zeta together with his brothers. He is last mentioned in 1388, after which his son Koja Zaharia emerged as the autonomous lord of Dagnum and Shati. Through his daughter’s marriage to Komnen Arianiti, Nikollë became the maternal grandfather of several leading figures of the Arianiti family, including Gjergj Arianiti.

== Name ==
Nikollë Zaharia's name appears in sources under multiple variations. In Albanian, he is usually referred to as Nikollë Zaharia, and in Serbo-Croatian as Nikola Zakarija or Nikola Sakat. Venetian documents render his name as Nicholao Sachat/Sacchat. The American historian John Van Antwerp Fine Jr. has also used Nicholas Zakarija. Nikollë's epithet - Sakat - is derived from the village of Sakat near Dagnum in the greater Pult region, which may be his family's place of origin. There are two theories regarding the location of this village; the first is that the village sat above Dagnum as part of the Zaharia family's possessions, whilst the second is that the village was located in Upper Pult, according to Serbian charters written in the first half of the 14th century.

== Castellan of Budva ==
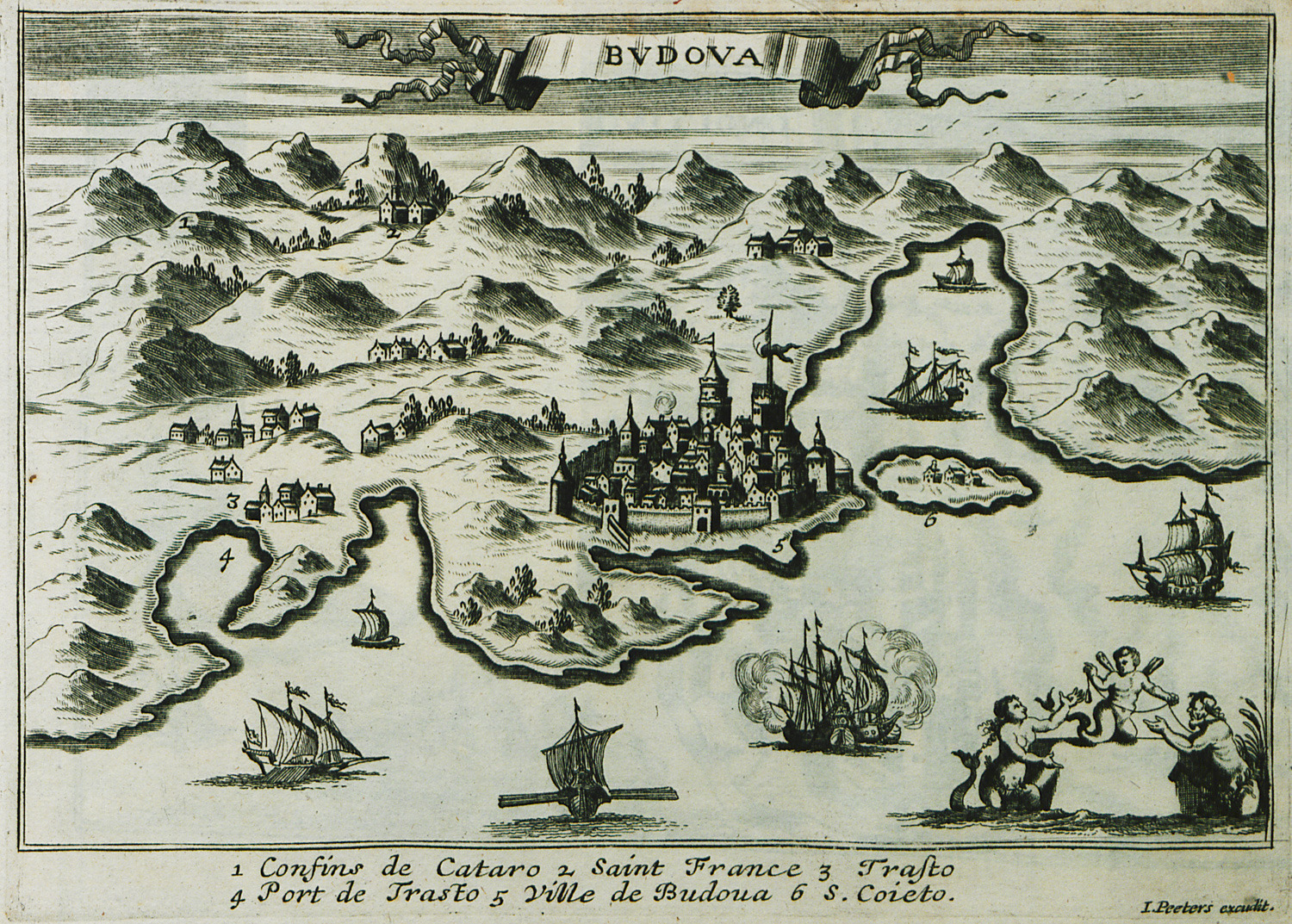
17th-century map of Budva

The coastal town of Budva had come under the influence of the new lords of Zeta, the Balsha family, in 1361. In the autumn of 1364, ships from Kotor besieged Budva, and during the protracted siege, they managed to kill Površka, the previous castellan of Budva. Budva managed to hold out, and the Balsha came to the town's aid. Nikollë Zaharia appears in sources as the new castellan of the town with the title of vojvod. Along with his brothers - Andrea, Gjin, Dhimitër and Progon - Nikollë became an honorary citizen of Ragusa on 28 October 1365, and he was also elected as a Venetian citizen in July of the following year. These grants reflected Budva’s strategic importance to both republics on the southern Adriatic coast, where it controlled access to and from Kotor. Nonetheless, Venice and Ragusa continued to recognize the overall authority of the Balsha family. Between 1365 and 1369, the Venetians demanded compensation for damages caused by Površka’s mistreatment of Venetian merchants. Venice first sought payment of this debt from Površka’s widow and heirs, and then from the Balsha family themselves. Nikollë was ultimately obliged to compensate the Venetians.

During the Venetian-Genoese War of 1378, the Croatian-Hungarian Kingdom and the Ragusans sided with the Genoese. The Venetian fleet captured Kotor on 13 August 1378 from Louis I, and the cities of Kotor and Ragusa found themselves in opposing camps. At the beginning of February 1379, an envoy sent by Nikollë stayed in Ragusa, and on 13 February, the Ragusans decided to provide the envoy with a boat and a man to accompany him back to Budva. The purpose of the envoy’s visit is uncertain, though it was likely related to the planning of coordinated actions against the Venetians in Kotor, as suggested by subsequent events. In June of that year, the people of Kotor attempted to overthrow the Venetians, forcing the local garrison to retreat into the town's fortress. In need of a military ally, the Ragusans sent a charter to Nikollë to confirm his rights as a Ragusan citizen, hoping to draw him into the war against the Venetians in Kotor.

In coordination with the Ragusans, Nikollë prevented Kotor from securing revenues from the salt trade, and detained a ship bound for Kotor that was loaded with salt. On 7 May 1380, the Ragusan Major Council decided that the ship should secretly be diverted to Ragusa instead, and in return for his help, Nikollë was gifted a substantial amount of fine cloth. Twenty days later, the Ragusan Minor Council decided to house Nikollë in the city as a sign of gratitude for his help, awarding him 10 perpera for living expenses and a house for lodging.

In 1382-1383, Tvrtko I of Bosnia opened a new salt trading centre in the town of Novi in Dračevica, which harmed the Ragusan salt trade. The Ragusans protested directly to Tvrtko and the Hungarian court, and they also sent envoys to other important coastal towns to ask that they refrain from delivering salt to the new market at Novi. In order to avoid open conflict with Tvrtko, the Ragusans contacted Nikollë and asked for his help in intercepting disobedient merchant ships from Zadar, and it became a regular occurrence for ships to have their cargo seized and ransomed so that they'd go to Ragusa instead of Novi. Tvrtko would besiege Kotor in mid-1382, and Nikollë played an active role by intercepting Ragusan ships bound for Kotor. In the beginning of 1383, Nikollë confiscated numerous trade goods valued at a total of 120 ducats from a Ragusan merchant, who tried to reclaim them at the end of February. It is unknown whether restitution was made and whether these events damaged the relations between Nikollë and the Ragusans.

Following the death of Balsha II at the Battle of Savra in 1385, several noble families sought to break away from Zeta, the first of which was the Zaharia family, which aimed to establish full independence. Nikollë Zaharia and his brother Andrea came into conflict with Balsha II's successor, Gjergj II Balsha, sometime around 1386. Nikollë is mentioned by Ragusan documents in late March 1386 as Gjergj II's equal and as a highly influential figure in Zeta. He was mentioned for a final time in sources on 14 January 1388, when the Ragusans allowed him to purchase large amounts of grain from them.

== Death and legacy ==
It is unknown if Nikollë died of natural causes or whether he was executed, as according to Mavro Orbini’s account, Gjergj II Balsha punished the rebels by taking out their eyes. In support of Orbini's account is the fact that Nikollë is not mentioned in any subsequent documents or contemporary sources. Nikollë's son, Koja Zaharia, would appear in historical sources from 1396 onwards as the autonomous lord of Shati and Dagnum. Komnen Arianiti married Nikollë's daughter, and they had three sons - Gjergj, Muzakë (the father of Moisi Golemi), and Vladan (Skanderbeg's brother-in-law) - and a daughter, who married Pal Dukagjini. The Sagat (Sakati) were a Ragusan noble family of Albanian origin from the region of Pult. A member of this family was documented in Ragusa on 29 July 1379 as a Ragusan subject, and the family is considered to have been connected to the Zaharia and the Balsha families.
