= Irene Dushmani =

15th century Albanian Princess

- Princess of Zadrima and Pult
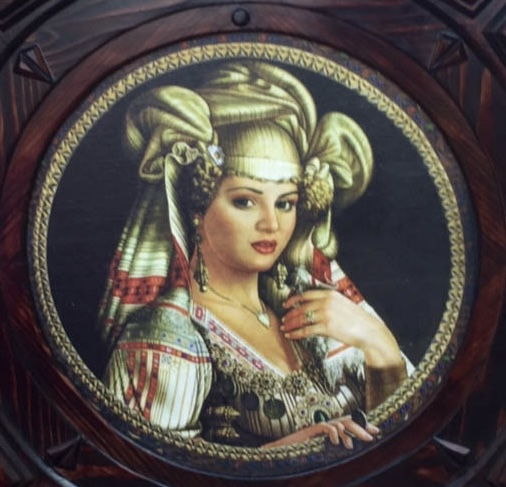
- Modern painting imagining Irene in early 20th century Zadrima folk clothing.

Princess of Zadrima
- Born: 15th century Medieval Albania
- Died: Unknown
- Spouse: Lekë Zaharia Altisferi
- Dynasty: Dushmani
- Father: Lekë Dushmani
- Religion: Roman Catholic

Irene Dushmani (Albanian: Jerina Dushmani) was a 15th century Albanian Princess of the Dushmani family that ruled over the north-western part of the country. Her father was Prince Lekë Dushmani, the Lord of Zadrima and a participant of the League of Lezhë. The Albanian princes Lekë Dukagjini and Lekë Zaharia Altisferi would enter a feud with one another over her hand in marriage among other quarrels.

== Life ==
The two aforementioned Albanian princes, Lekë Dukagjini and Lekë Zaharia, were both in love with Irene. During Skanderbeg's absence at the wedding of Muzakë Topia and Mamica Kastrioti, the two men exchanged looks and insults before duelling, and this ultimately culminated in a proper clash between the men of both sides. According to Fan Noli, Dukagjini was wounded by a spear, and as many as 105 people were killed during the clash; this led to Lekë Dukagjini eventually murdering Lekë Zaharia, and Dukagjini would hold a grudge against Skanderbeg. In reality, Nicholas Dukagjini was the one to kill Zaharia a few years later, over territorial dispute. As per Marin Barleti, Irene preferred Lekë Zaharia and might have possibly been betrothed to him, but this decision was not accepted lightly by Lekë Dukagjini. However, Irene was not the only reason for the feud between the two Albanian princes, as other issues, such as the ownership of Dagnum, were also existent between their respective families.

== See also ==
- Lekë Dukagjini
- Lekë Zaharia
- Dushmani family
