= Pjetër Zaharia =

15th-century Albanian Roman Catholic Prelate

Pjetër Zaharia (13?? – 3 July 1422) was an Albanian prelate of the Roman Catholic Church.

== Life ==
Pjetër Zaharia was born in the mid 14th century in northern Albania. He came from the noble Albanian family of Zaharia. Most historians attribute the establishment of relations between Pope Boniface IX and the Zakaria family to him. In 1390 Zakaria became bishop of the Roman Catholic Diocese of Sapë and Dagnum.
