= Little Tanush =

Son of Pal Dukagjini

- Died: before 1433
- Noble family: Dukagjini
- Father: Pal Dukagjini
- Occupation: Vassal of the Serbian Despotate (?); Vassal of the Republic of Venice (?); Vassal of the Ottoman Empire (1429–?)

Tanush Dukagjini (fl. 1423–33), known as Little Tanush (Albanian: Tanushi i Vogël), was an Albanian nobleman, a member of the Dukagjini family, the son of Pal I Dukagjini. He had four brothers: Progon (d. 1394), Pal II (d. 1402), Andrea (d. 1416), and Gjon Dukagjini (d. 1446).

In 1398, he surrendered to the Ottomans, but in 1402, after their defeat at Ankara and the capture of Sultan Bayezid I, he freed himself from them.

In January 1423, during the Second Scutari War, the Republic of Venice bribed and won over the Pamaliots on Bojana, and then bought over several tribal leader in or near Zeta: the Paštrovići, Gjon Kastrioti (who had extended to the outskirts of Alessio), the Dukagjins, and Koja Zaharija. Though none of these were mobilized militarily by Venice, they left the ranks of Lazarević's army, thus became a potential danger to Lazarević. Although Venetian admiral Francesco Bembo offered money to Gjon Kastrioti, Dukagjins and to Koja Zaharija in April 1423 to join the Venetian forces against Serbian Despotate, they refused.

Supported by the Ottomans, Stefan Maramonte plundered the region around Scutari and Ulcinj, and attacked Drivast in 1429, but failed to capture it. He was accompanied by Gojčin Crnojević and Little Tanush. In April 1429, Tanush received a gift of 120 perpers from the Republic of Ragusa.

== Annotations ==
- Name: Tanush Dukagjin, known as Little Tanush or "Tanush Minor".

== Sources ==
- Fine, John Van Antwerp (1994). The Late Medieval Balkans: A Critical Survey from the Late Twelfth Century to the Ottoman Conquest. University of Michigan Press. ISBN 978-0-472-08260-5.
