= Lekë Dukagjini =

15th century Albanian nobleman

Lekë III Dukagjini
- Prince of Dukagjini
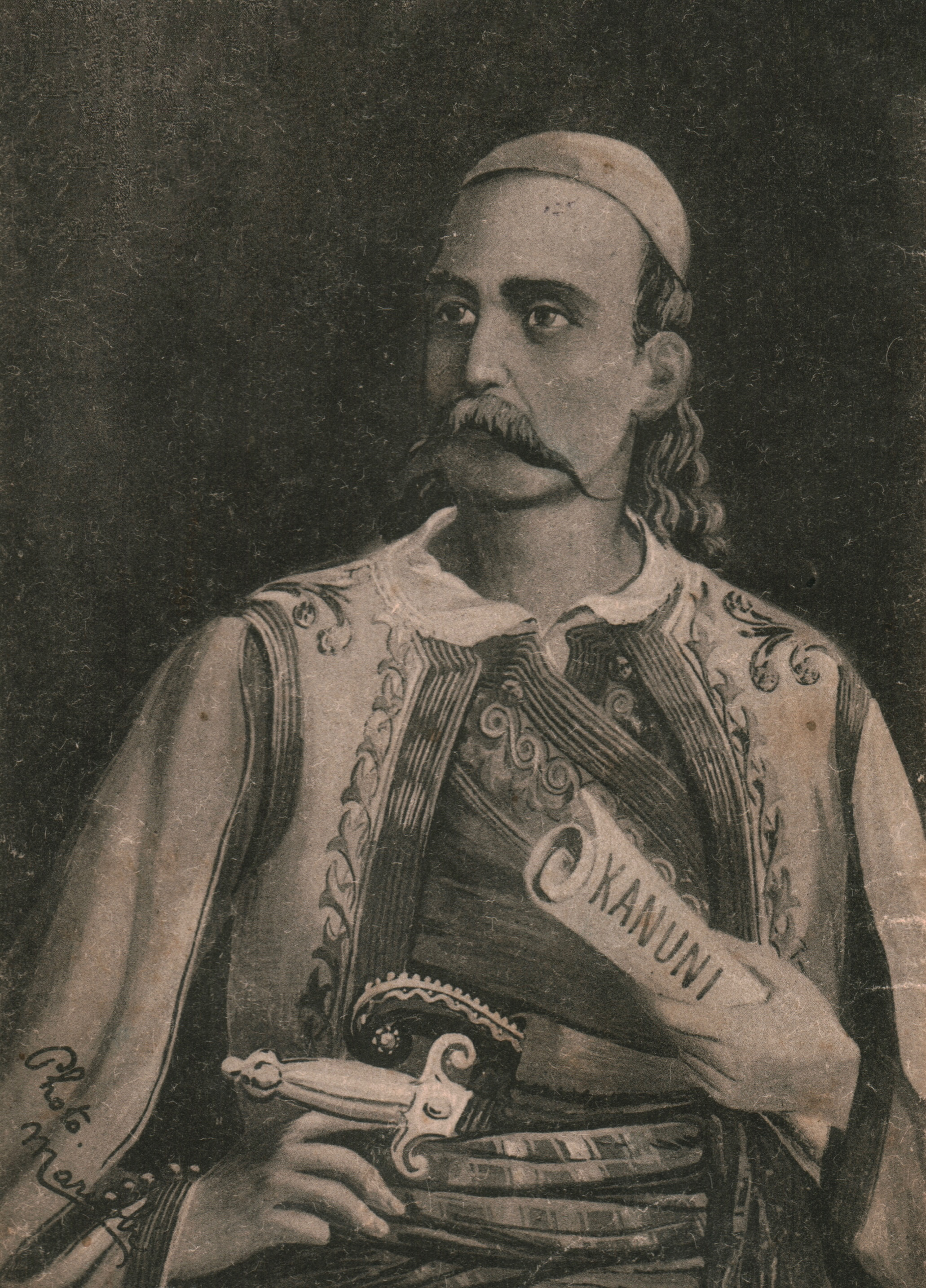
- Postcard illustration of Lekë Dukagjini in 19th century folk clothing holding the Kanun

Prince of Dukagjini
- Reign: 1446–1479
- Predecessor: Pal Dukagjini
- Successor: Post abolished
- Born: 15th century Lipjan
- Died: after 1481
- Spouse: Theodora Muzaka
- Dynasty: Dukagjini
- Father: Pal Dukagjini
- Mother: Unknown
- Religion: Roman Catholic

Lekë III Dukagjini (died after 1481), commonly known as Lekë Dukagjini, was a 15th-century Albanian nobleman who ruled the Principality of Dukagjini from 1446 until the Ottoman conquest in 1479. A member of the Dukagjini family, he was a contemporary of Skanderbeg and participated in the Albanian resistance against the Ottoman Empire. Dukagjini is best known for the Code of Lekë Dukagjini, a code of customary law that bears his name and governed the tribes of northern Albania for centuries.

== Early life ==
Lekë Dukagjini was the son of Pal Dukagjini, ruler of the Principality of Dukagjini, a feudal domain in the High Middle Ages that encompassed parts of northern Albania, including the hinterlands of Lezhë, Mirditë, and Pukë. Pal died in 1446 of apoplexy at the age of 61. Until 1444, Lekë seemed to have been a pronoier of Koja Zaharia.

Lekë belonged to the younger branch of the Dukagjini family, which contemporary Albanian nobles considered less prestigious than the older line. According to chronicler Gjon Muzaka, the older branch was regarded as the "house of the true Dukagjini", while Lekë's line through Pal Dukagjini was seen as having risen only recently through fortune. This distinction fueled bitter internal conflicts within the family, particularly with Nicholas Dukagjini and his son Draga from the older line. This Nicholas from the older line should not be confused with Lekë's brother Nicholas Pal Dukagjini. According to Muzaka, the Dukagjini claimed descent from Troy and maintained that an ancestor had accompanied the French king on a Crusade to Jerusalem.

=== Conflict with Lekë Zaharia ===
According to Marin Barleti, in his biography of Skanderbeg, a conflict arose between Dukagjini and Lekë Zaharia, lord of Dagnum, on 26 January 1445, during the wedding of Skanderbeg's sister, Mamica Kastrioti, to Karl Muzakë Thopia. The dispute reportedly concerned Irene Dushmani, the daughter of the lord of Zadrima, Lekë Dushmani. The two lords had been in dispute over who should marry Irene, as she was the only child of Dushmani. Dukagjini asked Irene to marry him but Zaharia, drunk, saw this and assaulted Dukagjini. Some other lords attempted to stop the fight, but only more people became involved, resulting in several deaths until peace was established. Neither of the two had suffered any physical damage, but after the event Dukagjini was morally humiliated. Subsequently, two years later, in 1447, in an act of revenge, Dukagjini and his men ambushed and murdered Zaharia. According to Venetian chronicler Stefano Magno, it was Nicholas Dukagjini of the older family line, Zaharia's own vassal, who murdered him, not Lekë. Following his death, Zaharia's widow surrendered the fortress of Dagnum to Venice. Original Venetian documents contradict this account by showing that Zaharia's widow actually handed over the fortress in September 1443. Nevertheless, Skanderbeg demanded the Venetians that the fortress be handed to the League of Lezhë, as Zaharia had been a member. The refusal of this request eventually led to the Albanian–Venetian War.

== Conflict with Venice ==
In March 1451, Dukagjini and Božidar Dushmani planned to attack Venetian-controlled Drisht, apparently over disputes over scarce pastures, but their plot was discovered and Božidar was forced to flee into exile.

On 29 October 1456, Dukagjini managed to capture Dagnum by bribing a Venetian officer and maintaining contacts with conspirators inside the fortress. On a dark autumn night, his men approached with precisely measured ladders, scaled the walls, and surprised the Venetian commander Antonio Dolfin in his bed. According to Swiss historian Oliver Schmitt, Dukagjini ordered Dolfin's beheading, raped his daughter, and expelled his family half-naked toward Shkodër. During these events, Dukagjini also cut off the right hand of the nobleman Vasilio Hungaros. Following this success, he advanced toward Drisht but suffered a heavy defeat at the hands of its citizens and reinforcements from Shkodër, in which approximately 1,200 of his men died on the battlefield or drowned in the Drin. Dukagjini himself escaped into the mountains with about 60 followers. It was speculated in Venice and Venetian Albania that Alfonso V of Aragon was behind this. As a result, Venetian authorities issued a proclamation offering a reward of 1,000 ducats for Dukagjini's dead body and 1,500 ducats for his capture alive. This notice was circulated throughout the Venetian possessions in Albania and Kotor.

However, Dagnum seems to have remained under his control only briefly. In June 1457, the Venetians succeeded in retaking the fortress after heavy fighting, during which an Italian condottiere fell, forcing Dukagjini to flee once more into the mountains with only 16 men.

=== Alliance with the Ottomans ===
Afterward, Dukagjini sought support from the Ottomans, opening the mountain passes to them. He was thus responsible for a major Ottoman invasion of Mat, Skanderbeg's heartland, which inflicted a severe defeat on the League of Lezhë.

With their assistance, he captured the nearby fortress of Sati from Draga Dukagjini of the older family line in the winter of 1457–58. Lekë's forces wreaked such devastation in Draga's lands that his desperate subjects fled across the Adriatic to Apulia and the Marche. Draga remained behind with only a few nobles; by September 1458, he lamented to the Venetians that his land was "empty and abandoned." This left Dagnum again vulnerable to attacks by Lekë and the Ottomans, and prompted Venice to seek peace and cooperation with Skanderbeg, who had just lost his liege lord, Alfonso V, in order to act against the Dukagjini.

Dukagjini's alliance with the Ottomans and his ensuing conflict with Skanderbeg also led to a warning of excommunication, along with his brother, Nicholas, by Pope Pius II, announced through the archbishops of Antivari and Durrës. Despite their reputation as devout Catholics, their cooperation with the Ottomans caused significant tension with the local Catholic clergy.

=== Reconciliation ===
Under pressure from the Catholic Church, Venice, and Skanderbeg, the Dukagjini dispatched a Franciscan priest named Eugen in January 1459 to negotiate peace. As a gesture of goodwill, they released all Venetian captives and sought pardon for their actions. Tired of fighting and wanting a break from war, Venice accepted the offer, and peace was restored. As part of the peace agreement, the fortress of Sati was to be demolished. On 19 February 1459, hostilities between the parties formally ceased with the signing of a peace treaty in Shkodër, concluded between Lekë Dukagjini and his brothers and the Venetian statthalters Benedetto Soranzo of Shkodër, Luca Contarini of Lezhë, and Cresio de Molin of Drisht; the treaty explicitly included Draga Dukagjini of the older line.

Skanderbeg, however, disagreed with the outcome of the treaty, as the agreement did not place Lekë under his authority. As a result, in March–April 1459, Skanderbeg and his forces successfully captured Sati from Dukagjini before it could be demolished, thereby extending his rule in a wedge-like fashion to the Drin and positioning himself behind Venetian-held Dagnum. Concerned by this, Venice intervened and dispatched its Adriatic admiral Lorenzo Moro and the condottiere de Imola to demand Skanderbeg's withdrawal. Eventually, a formal treaty was signed on 4 June 1459 in Lezhë, enforcing Venice's wishes and temporarily restoring peace. In the treaty, Skanderbeg was recorded calling Lekë Dukagjini "the enemy of Christ and of me."

Sometime before June 1462, Draga Dukagjini was killed in the ongoing family conflict. Only his nephew Nikola survived, who was taken into Venetian service on 11 June 1462 and granted several villages in Zadrima. With Draga's death, Lekë became the undisputed lord of the highland territories along the Drin and Fan rivers, controlling the important caravan route over the Pukë ridge.

Amid the growing threat from the Ottoman Empire, Venice sought once again to mediate reconciliation between the Dukagjini and Skanderbeg through the provveditore Gabriel Trevizano in the autumn of 1463, though these efforts proved unsuccessful. During these negotiations, Lekë was recorded as declaring:

Furthermore, I do not wish to be under Skanderbeg, but I am quite content to be under any rector or provveditore of Your Signoria, should it so desire, and to obey it always. I also ask that, should Skanderbeg wage war against me, I may have the aid of Your most honorable Signoria, and likewise, should I wage war against him, I agree that he be aided.

Lekë also gave instructions to the Franciscan Eugen stipulating that if the Turks expelled him from his land, the Signoria should provide him a place to live with his sons and support his livelihood; and if Venice made peace with the Turks, he should be included as their protectee.

Peace between Skanderbeg and the Dukagjini brothers would be finally achieved later that same year through the intervention of the archbishop of Durrës, Pal Engjëlli.

== Later years ==
According to Marin Barleti, when Skanderbeg died in 1468, Lekë Dukagjini was the first to announce the news to the Albanian people. Barleti describes him rushing into the marketplace, tearing at his beard and hair, and crying out: "Gather quickly, all you princes! Today the gates of Epirus and Macedonia have been shattered, today our walls and fortresses have fallen; today all our strength and power has flown away; today our thrones and dominions have been overturned; today, together with this man, all our hope has been extinguished."

Following Skanderbeg's death, Dukagjini emerged as one of the principal leaders of the Albanian resistance against the Ottoman Empire, playing a significant role in a victory of Albanian forces under the walls of Krujë in 1477. After the cession of Shkodër by Venice to the Ottoman Empire, Lekë and his brother Nicholas emigrated to Italy, as did many other Albanian nobles. The two brothers would return to Albania once more after the death of Sultan Mehmed II in 1481, seeking to recover their former possessions and to spark a new uprising among the northern Albanian population, but their efforts would ultimately fail. Following this attempt, no further records concerning Lekë Dukagjini are known.

== Legacy ==
The Law of Lek Dukagjini (kanun) was named after Lekë Dukagjini who codified the customary laws of the Albanian highlands. Although researchers of history and customs of Albania usually refer to Gjeçovi's text of the Kanuni as the only existing version which is uncontested and written by Lekë Dukagjini, it was actually incorrect. The text of the Kanuni, often contested and with many different interpretations which significantly evolved since 15th century, was only named after Dukagjini. Whilst identifying Skanderbeg as the "dragon prince" who dared to fight against any foe, chronicles portray Dukagjini as the "angel prince" who, with dignity and wisdom, ensured the continuity of the Albanian identity.

The set of laws were active in practice for a long time, but it was not gathered and codified until the late 19th century by Shtjefën Gjeçovi. The most infamous laws of Kanuni are those regulating blood feuds. Blood feuds have started once again in Albania (and have since spread to other parts of Albania, and even to expatriates abroad) after the fall of communism in the early 1990s, having been outlawed for many years during the regime of Enver Hoxha, and contained by the relatively closed borders.

== See also ==
- Dukagjini family
- Principality of Dukagjini
- Nicholas Pal Dukagjini
- Siege of Shkodra

== Sources ==
- Malaj, Edmond (2017). "Dukagjinët gjatë Mesjetës. Shtrirja gjeografike e trojeve dhe disa karakteristika". Studime Historike (in Albanian) (1–2). Tirana: Akademia e Studimeve Albanologjike: 9–44. ISSN 0563-5799.
- Božić, Ivan (1979). Nemirno pomorje XV veka (in Serbian). Belgrade: Serbian Literary Guild. OCLC 5845972.
- Francione, Gennaro (2006) [2003]. Aliaj, Donika (ed.). Skënderbeu, një hero modern: (Hero multimedial) [Skanderbeg, a modern hero (Hero multimedia)] (in Albanian). Translated by Aliaj, Tasim. Tirana: Naim Frashëri. ISBN 99927-38-75-8.
- Hodgkinson, Harry (1999). Scanderbeg: From Ottoman Captive to Albanian Hero. London: Centre for Albanian Studies. ISBN 978-1-873928-13-4.
- Schmitt, Oliver Jens (2009). Skanderbeg: der neue Alexander auf dem Balkan (in German). Regensburg: Verlag Friedrich Pustet. ISBN 978-3-7917-2229-0.
- Fine, John Van Antwerp (1994). The Late Medieval Balkans: A Critical Survey from the Late Twelfth Century to the Ottoman Conquest. University of Michigan Press. ISBN 978-0-472-08260-5.
- Gegaj, Athanase (1937). L'Albanie et l'Invasion turque au XVe siècle (in French). Universite de Louvain.
- Noli, Fan Stilian (1947). George Castrioti Scanderbeg (1405–1468). International Universities Press. OCLC 732882.
- Gawrych, George (2006). The Crescent and the Eagle: Ottoman rule, Islam and the Albanians, 1874–1913. London: IB Tauris. ISBN 9781845112875.
- De Waal, Clarissa (2005). Albania today: a portrait of post-communist turbulence. Centre for Albanian Studies. I.B.Tauris. ISBN 9781850438595.
- Cook, Bernard (2001). Europe since 1945: an encyclopedia. Garland Publishing. ISBN 0-8153-4057-5.
