= Sati (castle) =

Medieval fortified town in Albania

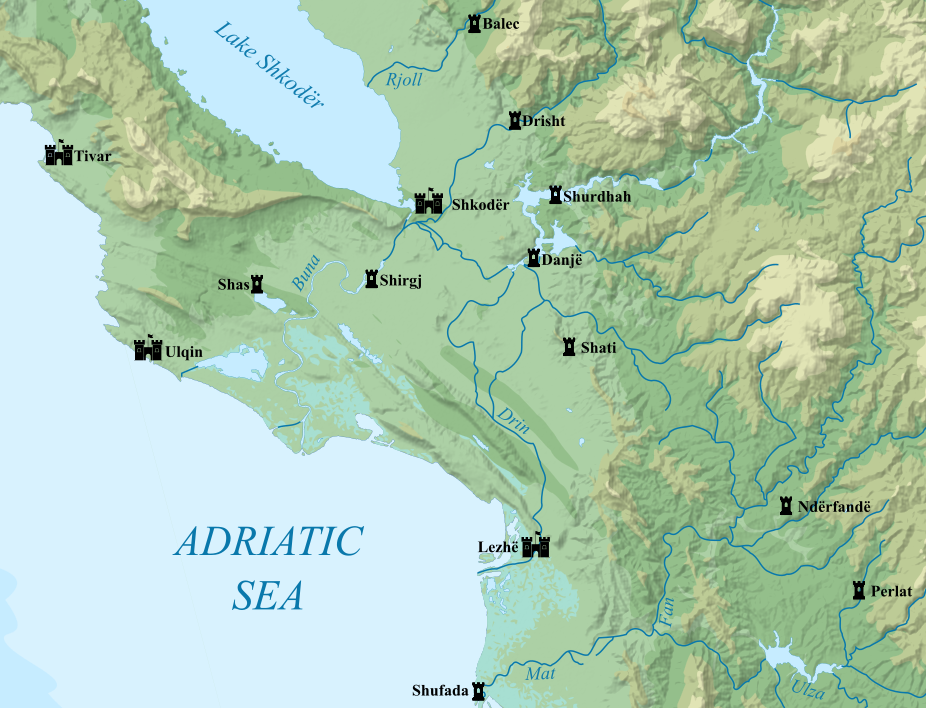
Position of Sati in 1448

Sati (Albanian: Shati; Latin: Satti) was a medieval fortified town near Shkodër in contemporary Albania. Between 1395 and 1459, it passed through the control of the Venetian Republic, the Dukagjini family, the Ottoman Empire, and Skanderbeg, who razed it sometime after 1459.

== History ==
=== Lordship of Zeta and Zaharia family ===
Together with Scutari and the surrounding region, Sati was a part of the Lordship of Zeta until 1395. It belonged to the fief of Konstantin Balšić, who appointed Koja Zaharia as Sati's castellan. In 1395 Balša II ceded Sati, together with Scutari and Drivast, to the Venetian Republic in order to create a buffer zone between his lordship and the Ottoman Empire. Zaharia refused to allow Venetians to take control of Sati and proclaimed himself lord of Sati and Dagnum ("dominus Sabatensis et Dagnensis"). Venetians attempted without success to capture Sati by force in 1396, by which time Zaharia was supported by Ottoman Empire because he had become an Ottoman vassal. Still, after a year Venetians managed to convince Koja to allow them to appoint Venetian citizen Progon Dukagjin on the position of castellan of Sati.

The Zaharia family was able to consolidate its control of Sati; another member, Pjetër Zakaria was bishop of Sati (eрisсорus Sati) in 1417. After his death, Koja Zaharia was succeeded by his son Lekë Zaharia.

=== During Skanderbeg's rebellion ===
Lekë Zaharia was killed in 1444 by his pronoiar, Nicholas Dukagjini. Because Lekë Zaharia joined the League of Lezhë in 1444 and Dukagjin was also a member, Skanderbeg requested that Venice cede Zaharia's former pronoia to him. In spite of Skanderbeg's claims, Zaharia's mother Boša and the population of Zaharia's pronoia supported the Venetian takeover of their towns, including Sati, because they were hostile toward Skanderbeg's League of Lezhë and preferred Venice to any local supporter of the League. Nikola Dukagjin continued his struggle, now against the new authorities, and managed to capture Sati and several villages without a fight. In 1446, Dukagjin appears in Venetian archives as a "former enemy" (tunc hostis noster).

After Venetian recaptured Dagnum from Lekë Dukagjini at the beginning of September 1457, the governor of Scutari initially granted the Zadrima region to Draga Dukagjin (another member of Dukagjin family and enemy of Lekë Dukagjini) under the excuse that it belonged to Sati. Draga Dukagjin, who was upset because of the treaty between Venetians and Lekë and Pal Dukagjini, begged the Venetian Senate to confirm his rights over the fortress of Sati. The Venetian Senate did not accept the decision of Scutari's governor and confirmed Draga Dukagjin's rights over Sati and the surrounding area on 11 September 1458.

In 1459, Skanderbeg's forces captured Sati from the Ottoman Empire and Skanderbeg ceded it to Venice in order to secure a cordial relationship with its Signoria before he sent his troops to Italy to help King Ferdinand to regain and maintain his kingdom after the death of king Alfonso V of Aragon. According to the treaty, the Venetians had an obligation to raze the fortress and to take away from the hill all remaining construction material to prevent future rebuilding of the fortress. Before the Venetians took control of Sati, Skanderbeg captured it and the surrounding area, driving Lekë Dukagjini and his forces away, then destroyed Sati.

== Sources ==
- Šufflay, Milan (1925), H. Barić (ed.), Srbi i Arbanasi : njihova simbioza u srednjem vijeku, Istorijska Serija (in Serbian) (Biblioteka Arhiva za Arbanasku Starinu, Jezik i Etnologiju ed.), Belgrade: Seminar za Arbanasku Filologiju, OCLC 249799501
- Gegaj, Athanase (1937), L'Albanie et l'Invasion turque au XVe siècle (in French), Universite de Louvain, ISBN 9780598935991, OCLC 652265147
- Noli, Fan Stilian (1947), George Castrioti Scanderbeg (1405–1468), International Universities Press, OCLC 732882
- Albanološki institut u Prištini (1968), Gjurmime albanologjike, Volumes 7-8 (in Serbian), Priština: Filozofski fakultet u Prištini. Katedra za albanologiju, p. 124
- Bešić, Zarij M. (1970), Istorija Crne Gore / 2. Crna gora u doba oblasnih gospodara. (in Serbian), Titograd: Redakcija za istoiju Crne Gore, OCLC 175122851
- Božić, Ivan (1979). Nemirno pomorje XV veka (in Serbian). Belgrade: Srpska književna zadruga. OCLC 5845972.
- Van Antwerp Fine, John (1987), The Late Medieval Balkans: A Critical Survey from the Late Twelfth Century, University of Michigan Press, ISBN 978-0-472-10079-8
- Antonović, Miloš (2003). Town and district in littoral of Zeta and northern Albania in 14th and 15th century (in Serbian). Belgrade: Istorijski institut. ISBN 978-86-7743-031-3. OCLC 55953999.
