= Stefano Magno =

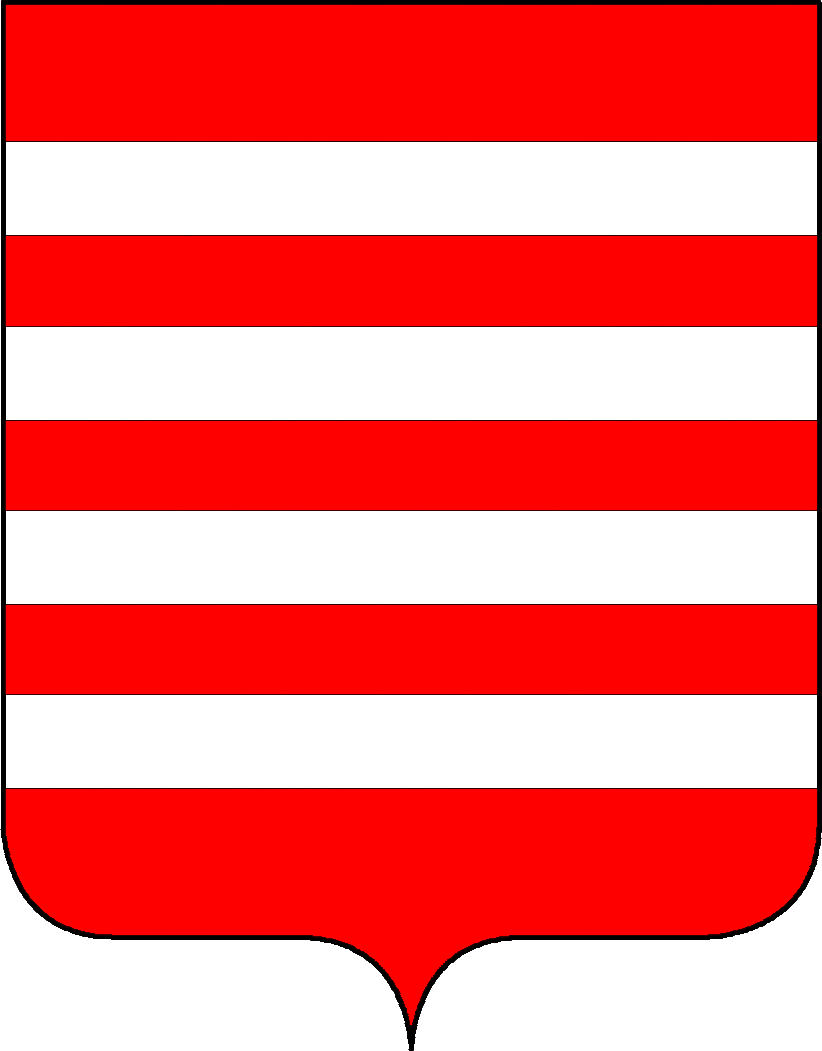
- Coat of arms of the Magno family
- Born: around 1499
- Died: 14 October 1572
- Occupation: chronicler

Stefano Magno (around 1499 – 14 October 1572) was a Venetian chronicler.

== Biography ==
According to Kenneth Setton, Stefano Magno was born around 1499 (his father's name was Andrea) and died on 14 October 1572. According to Marios Philippides he was born in 1490 and died in 1557. He was a member of the noble Venetian Magno family.

== Works ==
=== Cronaca Magno ===
The authorship of the manuscript often named as Cronaca Magno is attributed to Stefano Magno. This work is based on the work of Aeneas Sylvius (Pope Pius II). Stefano Magno frequently quotes dispacci of Bartolomeo Minio in his chronicle.

=== Annali Veneti e del Mondo ===
His work Annali Veneti e del Mondo is a five-volume manuscript archived in the library of the Museo Correr. This manuscript is described as "one of the more important literary sources for the last two decades of fifteenth century", providing "extraordinary coverage" of events almost all over Europe and Levant. It also covers the process of Conquest of Albania, by the Ottomans, and presents information about the Turkish conquest of Skanderbeg's stronghold, Krujë.

The 19th-century Greek historian and researcher Constantine Sathas published extracts of the Venetian chronicle of Stefano Magno connected with the history of Greece (Μνημεία Ελληνικής Ιστορίας [Monuments of Greek History]), which Kenneth Setton considers carelessly transcribed.

The first volume of his Annali Veneti e del Mondo describes the origins of the Venetian noble families and presents the alphabetically arranged list with dates of their admission to the Great Council of Venice, with their coats of arms presented in color. The fourth volume describes the period from 1478 to 1481, and contains a description of the Siege of Krujë in 1478.
