= Lekë Zaharia =

15th-century Albanian nobleman

- Lord of Shati and Danjë
- Reign: ?–1447
- Hereditary: Bosa Dukagjini
- Died: 1444 or 1447
- Cause of death: Assassination
- Noble family: Zaharia family
- Issue: Koja II Zaharia
- Father: Koja Zaharia
- Mother: Bosa Dukagjini

Lekë Zaharia Altisferi, or simply Lekë Zaharia (d. 1444), was an Albanian nobleman from the Zaharia family. Lekë ruled over the towns of Danjë and Shati in the Zadrima region of northern Albania, initially as an Ottoman vassal before later aligning himself with the Republic of Venice. In 1444, he became one of the founding members of the League of Lezhë, joining other Albanian princes under the leadership of Skanderbeg in their resistance against Ottoman expansion. Zaharia was killed later that same year in a feud with his vassal Nikollë Dukagjini, an event that sparked a wider conflict between Skanderbeg and the Republic of Venice.

== Early life ==
Lekë Zaharia was the son of Albanian nobleman Koja Zaharia, the ruler of Shati and Danjë, and his wife, Bosa Dukagjini. The Zaharia and Dukagjini noble families, whose territories shared borders, maintained close relations and would reinforce their ties through marriage alliances.

== Ruler of Danjë and Shati ==
The Ottomans eventually returned Danjë to the Zaharia family around 1436 and installed Lekë as its ruler, albeit as an Ottoman vassal. The Venetians transferred Lekë's subordination to the Ottomans onto his uncle, Tanush the Elder, who was the brother of Lekë's mother Bosa Dukagjini and a loyal ally to Venice. Tanush was therefore arrested shortly after on accusations of treason, which were ultimately related to Lekë's instalment as the ruler of Danjë under Ottoman vassalage.

Due to the elimination of their extensive autonomy, Albanian lords were forced to choose between aligning themselves with the Venetians or submitting entirely to the Ottomans. As such, Lekë Zaharia chose to become a citizen of the Republic of Venice in 1442. In 1444, Lekë was one of the founders of the League of Lezhë, a union of Albanian nobles who banded together to resist the Ottomans under the leadership of Skanderbeg. Lekë joined the league alongside his vassals Pal Dukagjini and Nikollë Dukagjini. Lekë's territories consisted of the towns of Danjë, Shati, Gjadër and Dushmani.

== Death and aftermath ==
Lekë Zaharia was killed as part of a feud in the summer of 1444 by his vassal, Nikollë Dukagjini. Lekë's son, Koja II, was an infant at the time of his father's death, and so Lekë's mother Bosa became the head of the family. She sought Venetian support and surrendered her son's former holdings of Shati and Danjë to them, whilst her son's remaining territories were taken by the Dukagjini family. In return, an estate and a pension were promised to Lekë's family by the Venetians, and they were also given a number of villages as fiefs which would later be seized by Nikollë Dukagjini. The Venetians would also take over Zaharia's other towns of Gjadër and Dushmani with the agreement of Lekë's mother.

Skanderbeg then demanded that Venice return Danjë and the Zaharia's other territories to League of Lezhë, as well as Drisht, but the Venetians declined. This event eventually triggered the Albanian–Venetian War in 1447. Skanderbeg would annihilate the Venetian army in a pitched battle in 1448, but due to the threat of the oncoming campaigns that were to be led by Sultan Murad II himself in the following years, Skanderbeg agreed to a peace deal with the Venetians. The peace deal was signed by Skanderbeg and Gjergj Arianiti, who represented the other Albanian princes, on 4 October 1448. The signatories agreed that Venice would keep Danjë, but in return, the Venetians would pay Skanderbeg an annual tribute of 1,400 ducats and an annual tax exemption for 200 horse loads of salt from Durrës. Nonetheless, threats were still exchanged between both sides and skirmishes would continue.

== Folklore ==
Although the rivalry between the Zaharia and Dukagjini families was actually based on the ownership of Danjë, a single account by Giammaria Biemmi in the 18th century, which he claimed to have based on the work of an anonymous author by the name of Tivarini, suggests that the conflict was centred around Jerina Dushmani - the daughter of Lekë Dushmani - and it places the date of Lekë's death at a later time. According to this account, a conflict arose during the wedding of Karl Muzakë Thopia and Mamica Kastrioti, Skanderbeg's sister, on 26 January 1445, as both Lekë Zaharia and Lekë III Dukagjini desired Jerina's hand in marriage. The two princes' servants supposedly began fighting, which prompted the two princes to become personally involved alongside their men. Somewhat of a battle ensued, resulting in numerous deaths and injuries, including the wounding of both Vrana Konti and Vladan Gjurica who tried to put a stop to it. Biemmi is the only historical author to have claimed the existence of such an event.

Biemmi also claimed that Lekë Zaharia was ambushed and killed months later in an attack organised by Lekë III Dukagjini; before being ambushed, Zaharia was on his way home after finalising the arrangements for his marriage to Jerina Dushmani. This claim was first made by contemporary Albanian author Marin Barleti, who depicted Lekë III Dukagjini in a negative light.

Regnal titles
Preceded by Koja Zaharia	Lord of Shati and Danjë before 1442–1444	Succeeded by Bosa (or Boša) Zaharia
