= Koja Zaharia =

Albanian nobleman (13??–c. 1442)

- Lord of Shati and Danjë ("Dominus Sabatensis et Dagnensis")
- Lordship: 1396–1430
- Predecessor: Konstantin Balšić
- Successor: Lekë Zaharia
- Other titles: 1423: Lord of Lezhë and Drisht
- Died: 1442
- Noble family: Zaharia
- Spouse: Bosa Dukagjini
- Issue: Lekë Zaharia; Boglia Zaharia; Busha Zaharia
- Father: Nikollë Zaharia

Koja Zaharia (also rendered as Zacharia, Zakarija; in Italian sources Coia Zaccaria; in Ragusan documents Kojčin or Gojčin) was a late 14th and early 15th-century Albanian nobleman, and the lord of Danjë and Shati. A member of the Zaharia family, he was the son of Nikollë Zaharia and initially served the Balsha rulers of Zeta. He continuously shifted his allegiance between the Ottomans, the Venetians, and the Serbian Despotate, seeking to preserve his family’s holdings in northern Albania.

Often styled in Venetian and Ragusan sources as Koja Albanensis (“Koja the Albanian”), he played a prominent role in the struggles over Shkodër and Lezhë, balancing ties with neighbouring lords such as the Jonima and the Dukagjini. He remained a significant figure in the region until the Ottoman conquest of Danjë in 1430, although his lands would soon be inherited by his son, Lekë.

== Name ==
Koja's surname has also been rendered as Zacharia and Zakarija, whilst in Italian sources, his name is recorded as Coia Zaccaria. In Ragusan documents, he is referred to as Lord Kojčin or Gojčin. As a result, numerous scholars, such as Nicolae Iorga, Ludwig Thalloczy and Konstantin Jireček have mistaken him for Gojčin Crnojević, his grandson who was named after him. Koja was often mentioned in Venetian and Ragusan sources as Koja Albanensis ('Koja the Albanian').

== Ancestry ==
Koja Zaharia was the son of Nikollë Zaharia, the castellan of Budva and a highly influential figure in Zeta who rebelled against Gjergj II Balsha, the Lord of Zeta. The Zaharia of Budva were also known by the surname Sakat/Sakati - this epithet is derived from the village of Sakat near Danjë in the greater Pult region, which may be this family's place of origin. There are two theories regarding the location of this village; the first is that the village sat above Danjë as part of the Zaharia family's possessions, whilst the second is that the village was located in Upper Pult, according to Serbian charters written in the first half of the 14th century.

== Lord of Danjë and Shati ==
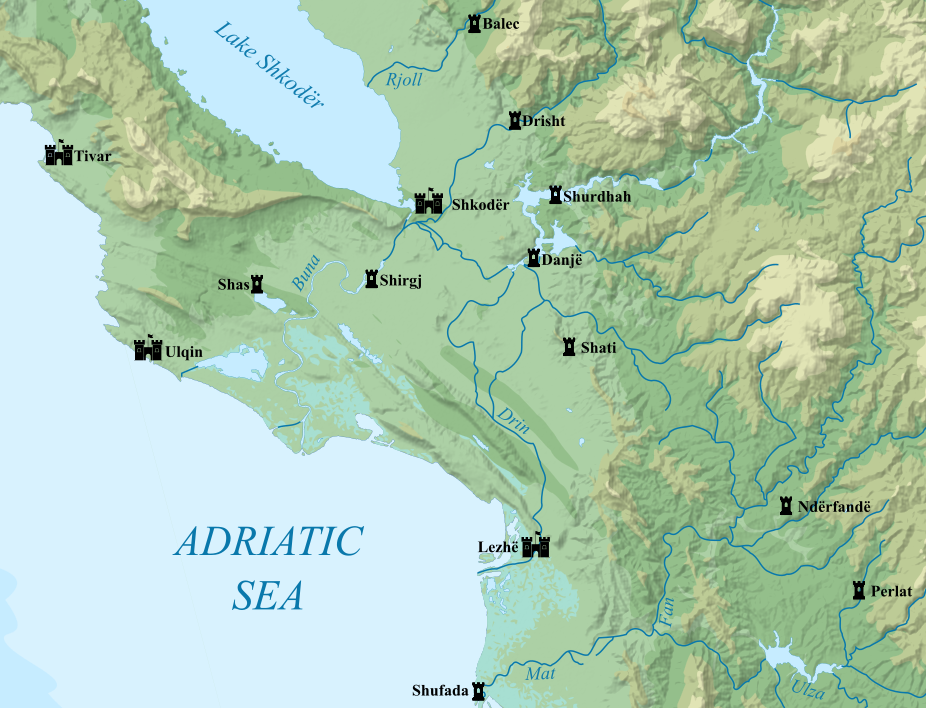
Position of Sati in 1488

After reclaiming some of his territories from the Ottomans in 1395, Gjergj II Balsha realised that he would not be able to resist any further Ottoman advances. As such, Gjergj II voluntarily ceded his holdings (including Danjë) to the Venetians in 1396. Zaharia, who held Danjë for the Balsha family, refused to forfeit the castle and became an Ottoman vassal instead. Zaharia became the lord of both Danjë and Shati, another castle mentioned in the treaty between Gjergj II Balsha and the Venetians. Zaharia's lands were bordered by the lands of Dhimitër Jonima to the south. Jonima was a close relative and the lord of Shufada. When the Venetians attempted to secure some of their claims in northern Albania towards the end of 1396, it is assumed that Zaharia was away serving in the Ottoman forces as a vassal of Sultan Bayezid. However, Shati would remain under Zaharia's control, and in 1397, Zaharia and the Venetians would come to an agreement; Progon Dumnjani, who was both a Venetian subject and Koja's son-in-law, would be installed as the castellan of Shati.

Ottoman incursions into Zeta would increase in the subsequent years, along with their impact on Zaharia and Jonima, who was now Zaharia's vassal. close relative and the lord of Shufada. Zaharia was often linked with the Jonima family in contemporary records, and he worked very closely with Dhimitër in particular. Zaharia had allowed the Ottomans passage through his lands to attack the Venetians in the Shkodër region, and so the Venetians entered into negotiations with the two lords. In October 1400, Franciscan friars arrived in Shkodër on behalf of Zaharia and Jonima, who wished to shift their allegiance towards Venice. Zaharia believed that the tribute asked of him from the Ottomans had become unbearable, and both lords expressed their willingness to come to an agreement with Venice and to abandon their positions as Ottoman vassals, with their representative stating that they had been forced to do so in order to retain possession of their lands. It was proposed that Zaharia and Jonima would stage an elaborate conflict with the Venetians in which they would appear to lose and therefore "surrender" their holdings. The proposal also consisted of the Venetians sending troops to the lords and assisting them in fortifying their lands to prevent further incursions, and on 7 October 1400, the Venetians promised to grant annual sums of 500 and 300 ducats to Zaharia and Jonima respectively to carry out those works. Additionally, the Venetians were to provide both men with lodging for each of their families. However, on 12 October, the Venetians discovered that Sultan Bayezid was mustering his military forces and that he had summoned Zaharia to join him as his vassal, and word had spread that Zaharia's intentions were not genuine. This prompted them to refuse the alliance proposal.

== Venetian Vassal ==
In 1402, Zaharia was amongst the many Albanian vassals of the Ottoman Empire who participated in the Battle of Ankara on the side of Sultan Bayezid. Upon learning of the Sultan's defeat and capture at Ankara, Gjergj II Balsha requested that the Venetians assert their control over the greater Shkodra region, including the lands belonging to Zaharia and Jonima, and that they be "returned" to him. In the meantime, Ottoman vassal Kostandin Balsha - the lord who held Danjë before Gjergj II Balsha's conquest and Zaharia's subsequent rise to power - unsuccessfully attempted to besiege Venetian-controlled Shkodër and was captured and executed in the process. Zaharia was closely associated with Kostandin, and upon learning of Kostandin's demise after returning from the Ottoman defeat at Ankara, he chose to abandon the Ottomans and become a Venetian vassal instead. The Venetians denied Gjergj II's request to have himself appointed as lord of the lands now belonging to Zaharia and Jonima, stating that they wished to maintain peaceful relations with their neighbours. Zaharia had sent the Bishop of Sapë/Shati to Venice to help facilitate his and Jonima's submission as vassals, which he had hoped to secure due to the growing threat of attack from Gjergj II Balsha.

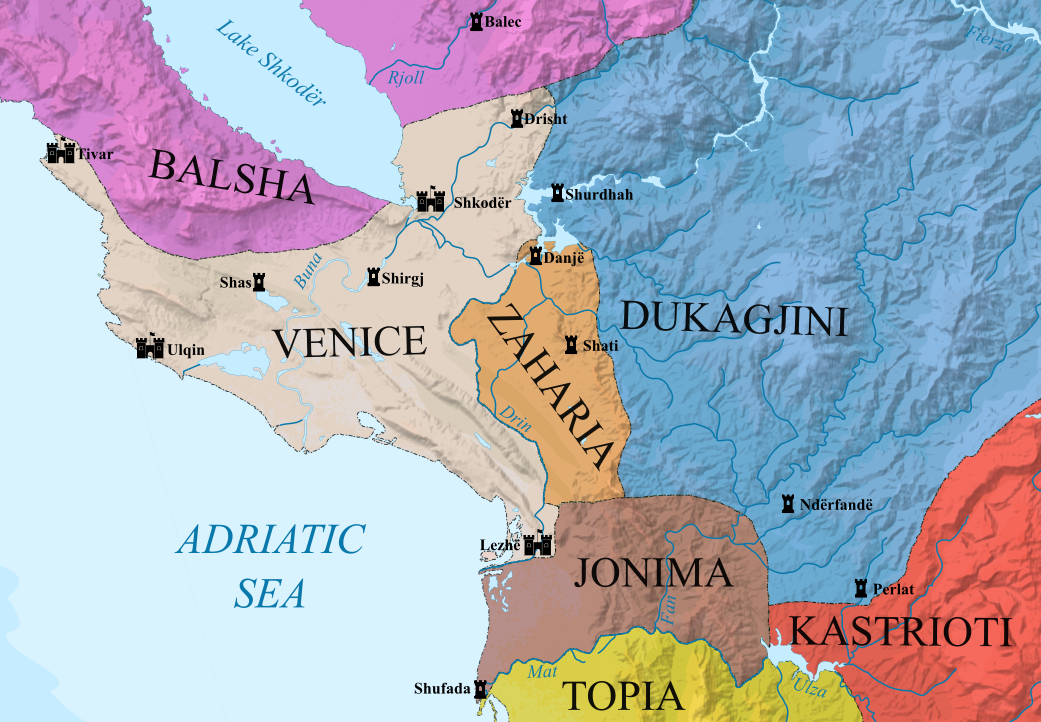
The domains of Koja Zaharia c. 1406, a year into the First Shkodra War.

The Venetians and Zaharia had agreed by 2 October 1402 that one of Zaharia's daughters would be sent to Shkodër as a hostage to secure their negotiations and Zaharia's intentions. A month later, taking into account the fact that Zaharia's domain bordered Venetian possessions and that friendship with him would secure their stability there, Venice agreed to the proposal and gifted Zaharia with a full set of armour valued at 38 ducats. Soon after, in June 1403, the Venetians had to warn Zaharia and Jonima against attacking Venetian subjects. In the subsequent conflict between Balsha III and the Venetians that began in 1405, Zaharia and Jonima continued to support the Venetians, and Zaharia quickly came to the aid of the Venetians. During or shortly after June 1405, a Venetian force assisted by Zaharia had been defeated, and Balsha III captured Drisht.

By 1407, the Zaharia and Jonima families would once again begin leaning towards the Ottomans. In 1410, Zaharia offered the Venetians the services of 500 of his cavalrymen in return for payment. Furthermore, he would promise to fight the Ottomans and place himself under Venetian protection yet again. The Venetians, however, were short on money and could not accept his services. By May of that year, the Senate had informed Zaharia that they considered him a loyal ally against the Ottomans and that they could bring him relief from the Ottoman prince Musa Çelebi, who had begun to encroach on the borders of Albania. The Venetians would continue to rely on Zaharia and his commanders as Musa continued his advances. In late 1412-early 1413, Zaharia's daughter Bolja married Balsha III, who then allowed Zaharia to administer Budva. Balsha III strengthened his connections with the neighbouring lords through his new father-in-law, and they would continue to support him in all subsequent conflicts. In 1414, Zaharia converted to Catholicism from the Serbian Orthodox Church which he formerly adhered to.

== Second War of Shkodër and conflict with Serbia ==
Balsha III and the Venetians had resumed their hostilities in 1419, with Balsha capturing Drisht that same year. Eventually, in order to defend Zeta from the Venetians, a sickly Balsha III offered his state to his uncle, Serbian despot Stefan Lazarević. Balsha III would die soon after his arrival to the Serbian court in April 1421, and his widow, Bolja, returned to her family in Danjë together their two daughters. The Venetians intervened and drafted new cadastres to reorganise Zeta, and Zaharia was formally reaffirmed as the lord of Danjë under Venetian authority. A conflict would ensue over Balsha III's former territories between the Serbian Despotate and the Venetians, and Zaharia was amongst the lords who supported Lazarević. By 1423, Zaharia was also ruling over Drisht and Lezhë as an ally of the despot, and he began to threaten Venetian subjects. Within Lezhë itself, Zaharia imposed the payment of the tithe. The Venetians would begin to negotiate with the local lords who were allied with Lazarević, intervening in Zaharia's territories to try and prevent him from taxing the locals. The Venetians attempted to bribe Gjon Kastrioti, Zaharia, and the Dukagjini family by giving them 300, 200, and 100 ducats respectively, and they distributed a further 300 ducats to those who felt cheated by receiving a lesser sum the first time around. These attempts failed at buying the lords' alliegance failed, and they remained loyal to Lazarević. Nonetheless, Venice would eventually buy Zaharia's allegiance.

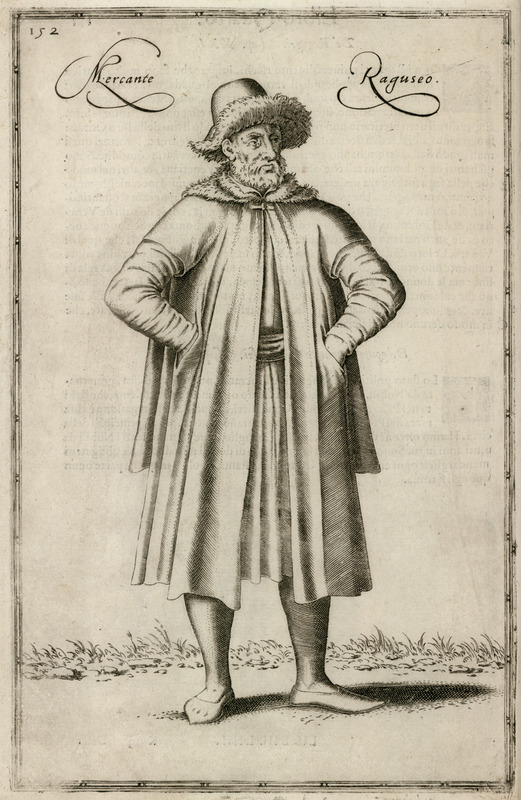
Historical depiction of a Ragusan merchant in 1580.

In the late 1420's, Zaharia came into conflict with despot Lazarević due to the latter's attempt at financially ruining the Zaharia family; large numbers of Ragusan merchants passed through Danjë when travelling to Serbia, so Lazarević ordered the Ragusans to abandon that route and to instead travel by the neighbouring road that ran through Lezhë so as to deprive Zaharia of his customs revenues. Zaharia's territories extended from Danjë to Lezhë, and so the Ragusans could not avoid passing through Zaharia's lands to reach Serbia. They continued to pass by Danjë and would continue to pay Zaharia's customs tax. Zaharia had once again grown closer to the Ottomans, who had begun to invade Serbia. When Stefan Balsha invaded Serbian-controlled Zeta in 1429 with Ottoman support in an attempt to become its ruler, Zaharia was quick to offer military support. Balsha's army captured the town of Drisht but failed to capture the citadel, and in the following year, the Ottomans abandoned Balsha's cause and attacked his allies.

== Dispossession and Legacy ==
Although Zaharia lost Danjë to the Ottoman commander Ali Beg in 1430, he was not punished due to his friendly relations with them, nor were any of his properties aside from Danjë confiscated from him. Zaharia's son, Lekë, would continue to collect customs taxes from Danjë in his father's place, until he was replaced by an Ottoman official on December 6, 1430. From this point onwards, Zaharia fades from historical records. Zaharia's son, Lekë, inherited his father's former domains. Lekë would be killed by the Dukagjinis in 1445 as part of a personal dispute, and Lekë's family surrendered Danjë to the Venetians and moved to Shkodër. When a great fire engulfed Shkodër on September 19, 1448, Zaharia's widow, Bosa, passed away.

== Family ==
Koja married Bosa Dukagjini (also known as Boska, Boxia, and Bosa), the daughter of Lekë I Dukagjini (great-grandfather of Lekë III Dukagjini). The couple had three children:

1. Lekë Zaharia - Lord of Danjë and one of the founders of the League of Lezhë. He was killed in 1444 by the Dukagjini family, and as his son, Koja II, was still too young to rule, Boksa inherited his lands instead.
2. Boglia Zaharia - Second wife of Balsha III. The couple had two children - a daughter, Teodora, and an unnamed son who died in infancy in 1415.
3. Busha Zaharia - Married Đurađ Đurašević Crnojević and had four sons; Đurašin Đurašević, Gojčin Crnojević, Stefan Crnojević, and another son whose name is unknown.

== See also ==
- Bosa Dukagjini
- Dagnum
- Drisht
- Zaharia family

== Sources ==
- Božić, Ivan (1979), Nemirno pomorje XV veka (in Serbian), Beograd: Srpska književna zadruga, OCLC 5845972

Regnal titles
Preceded by Post created	Lord of Sati and Dagnum; 1396–1430	Succeeded by Post abolished after Ottomans under Ishak Bey captured this territory and entrusted it to Ali Beg
