= List of Albanian monarchs =

Monarchy of Albania
- Monarkia e Shqipërisë
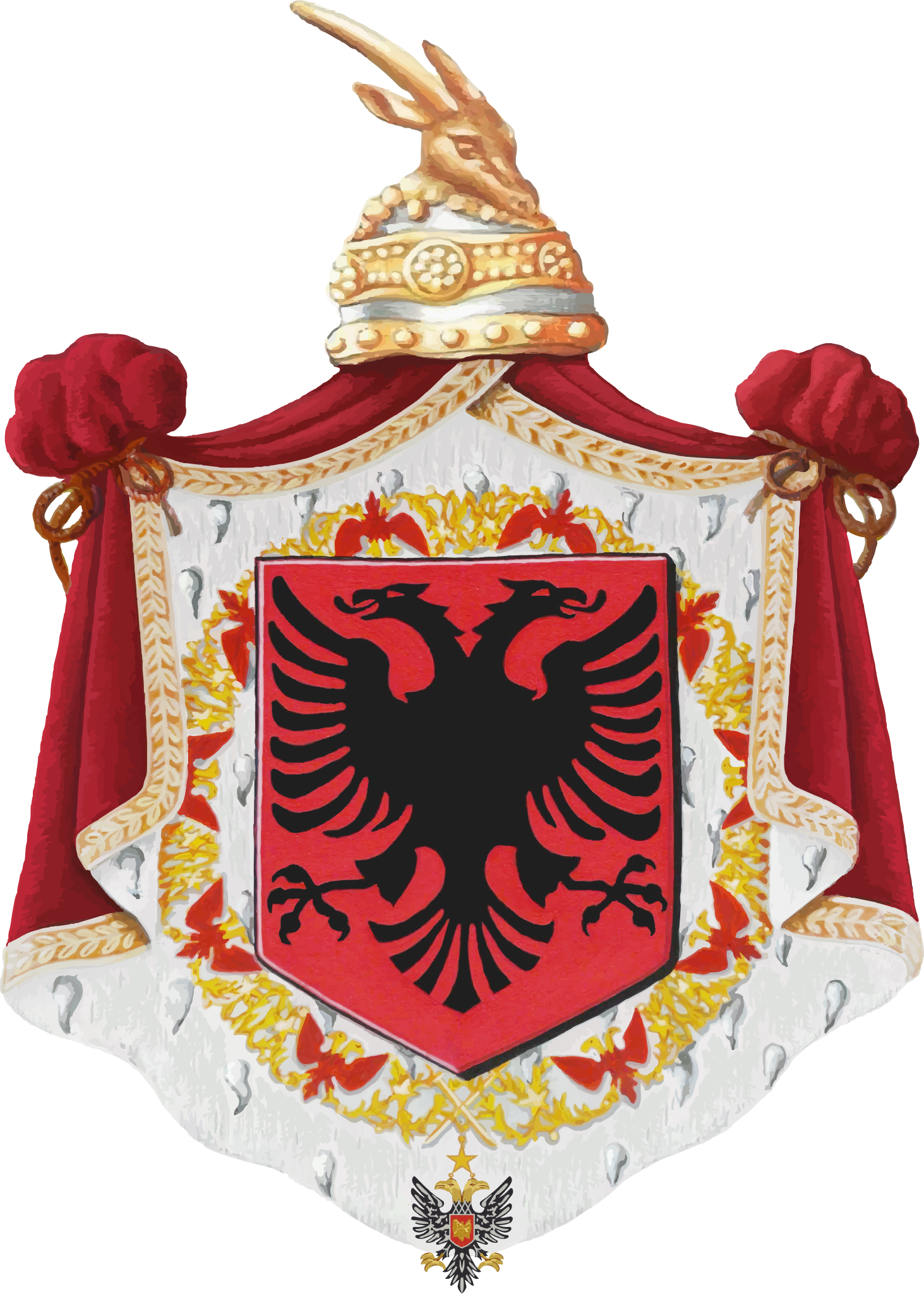
- Royal Coat of arms of Albania

- Last Monarch; Victor Emmanuel III

Details
- Style: His Majesty
- First monarch: Progon, Lord of Kruja
- Last monarch: Victor Emmanuel III
- Formed: Approximately 1190 AD.
- Abolished: 8 September 1943
- Residences: Royal Palace of Tirana; Royal Palace of Durrës; Royal Villa of Durrës; Burgajet Castle
- Pretenders: Leka, Crown Prince of Albania; Leka, Prince of Albania

This is an archontological list of Albanian monarchs, containing monarchs of the medieval Albanian principalities, Albanian kingdoms and to heads of state of modern Albania. Starting from the first established monarch Progon of Kruja from the Progoni family who ruled the Principality of Arbanon starting in 1190. Throughout history, the monarchs of Albania have held multiple different titles, often Latin or Byzantine, and in rare instances, Slavic. Some of these titles include King of Albania, Prince of Albania, Despot, and Sebastokrator. Members of the medieval Albanian monarchy were integral to the formation of the Albanian nobility. The monarchy in Albania was abolished on the 8th of September, 1943.

== Principality of Arbanon (1190–1257) ==
=== House of Progoni ===
Picture	^{Title}Name	Reign	Notes
	^{Lord of Krujë} Progoni	1190–1198	Progon was the first known Albanian ruler of the first ever known Albanian State. He is mentioned to carry the Byzantine title of Archon in the Geziq inscription.
	^{Lord of Krujë} Gjin Progoni	1198–1208	Eldest son of Progoni.
	^{Prince of Albania} Dhimitër Progoni	1208–1216	Youngest son of Progoni. He secured further independence for Arbanon and extended the Principality to its maximum height.

=== House of Kamona ===
Picture	^{Title}Name	Reign	Notes
	^{Lord of Krujë} Grigor Kamona	1216–12??	A Greek-Albanian Lord, he first married the daughter of Gjin Progoni, then married Komnena Nemanjić who was the Widow of Dhimitër Progoni allowing him to inherit the rule of the Principality Arbanon.

=== Unknown ===
Picture	^{Title}Name	Reign	Notes
	^{Lord of Krujë} Golem of Kruja	12??–1257	The last ruler of the principality of Arbanon. He rose to power through his marriage to the daughter of Gregorios Kamonas. The ascension of Golem was regarded as a reversion to the native rule of Albania.

== Principality of Gropa (1258–????) ==
=== House of Gropa ===
Image	Name	Notes
	^{Lord of Deabolis and Debar} Pal Gropa	Pal Gropa, also known as Paul or Paulo Gropa, (Pal Gropa) was an Albanian feudal ruler of Ohrid and Dibër from the 13th century and a member of the Gropa family. He held the title of Sebastos.
	^{Lord of Ohrid} Andrea II Gropa	Andrea Gropa was a 14th-century Albanian nobleman who ruled the region and the city of Ohrid, first as a minor vassal for a very short time (župan) to Serbian King Vukašin Mrnjavčević (r. 1365–1371), then as independent after 1370. He was a rival to Prince Marko and together with Andrea II Muzaka managed to take Prilep and Kostur from him. He hailed from the noble Gropa family.
	Zacharia Gropa	Zacharia Gropa (Albanian: Zeqiri Gropaj) was an Albanian nobleman who lived during the 15th-century and member of the Gropa family who historically ruled over parts of modern-day Albania and North Macedonia. He was a military commander who served in the forces of Skanderbeg during Skanderbeg's rebellion. He was also an associate of Moisi Dibra.
	Pal II Gropa	
	Andrea I Gropa	
	Aidin Gropa	Lord of Vrezhda sometime during the 14th century.

== Principality of Blinishti (13th century–1330) ==
=== House of Blinishti ===
- Vlado Blinishti
- Kalojan Blinishti
- Gulielm Blinishti

== Principality of Skuraj (13th century) ==
=== House of Skuraj ===
- Gjergj Skura
- Pepe Skura
- Pjetër Skura
- Mihal Skura
- Progon Skura

== Kingdom of Albania (1272–1368 & 1376-1383) ==
=== House of Anjou ===
Picture	^{Title}Name	Reign	Notes
	^{King of Albania} Charles I of Anjou	1272–1285	Charles of Anjou established the Kingdom of Albania in 1271 through diplomatic efforts and alliances with local Albanian leaders. In February 1272, a delegation of Albanian nobles and citizens from Durrës reached Charles's court, where he signed a treaty declaring himself the King of Albania "by common consent of the bishops, counts, barons, soldiers, and citizens." The treaty solidified the union between the Kingdom of Albania and the Kingdom of Sicily under Charles of Anjou, who, with the title of "King of Albania," promised to protect the Albanians and honor their Byzantine privileges.
	^{King of Albania} Charles II of Naples	1285–1294	Charles II of Naples inherited the title "King of Albania" from his father, Charles I of Anjou after his death. Charles II assumed this claim as part of his broader inheritance, which included territories in Italy and France. In August 1294, Charles II then passed his rights on Albania to his son Philip I, Prince of Taranto.
	^{King of Albania} Philip I, Prince of Taranto	1294–1331	After gaining the rights of Albania from his father Charles II of Naples in 1294. Philip reigned as Lord of the Kingdom of Albania and solidifying his position as the ruler of the kingdom. In November 1294, Philip I strengthened ties with the Epirote Despot Nikephoros I by marrying his daughter, thereby renewing the longstanding alliance between the Kingdom of Albania and Epirus. Although his initial plans to recover Angevin's domains were delayed due to his imprisonment by Frederick III of Sicily in 1299, Philip I, upon his release in 1302, actively pursued reclaiming the Albanian kingdom. With the support of local Albanian Catholics and Pope Benedict XI, he successfully regained control of Durrës and granted privileges to the citizens and nobility. Despite facing challenges and territorial restrictions, Philip I played a crucial role in maintaining the Kingdom of Albania and defending it against external pressures.
	^{King of Albania} Robert, Prince of Taranto	1331–1332	Robert of Taranto inherited the title Lord of the Kingdom of Albania after the death of his father, Philip I, in 1331. His uncle, John, Duke of Durazzo, who did not want to swear fealty to Robert for the Principality of Achaea, arranged to surrender Achaea to Robert in exchange for his rights to the diminished Kingdom of Albania and a loan of 5,000 ounces of gold raised upon Niccolo Acciaiuoli.
	^{Duke of Durrës} John, Duke of Durazzo	1332–1336	After acquiring the Kingdom of Albania from his nephew Robert, Prince of Taranto in 1332, John of Gravina, also known as John of Anjou, assumed the title of Duke of Durrës. While the available information doesn't offer detailed insights into his specific actions or policies in Albania, it's known that he never used a royal title "Regnum Albaniae" during his rule.
	^{Duke of Durrës} Charles, Duke of Durazzo	1336–1348	Charles of Durrës inherited the title of Duke of Durrës and Count of Gravina from his father, John, after his death. His rule in Albania is not extensively documented. However, it's known that Charles was part of the faction that opposed Joan I of Naples and Louis of Taranto.
	^{Duchess of Durrës} Joanna, Duchess of Durazzo	1348–1368	Joanna of Durazzo's rule as Duchess of Durrës began in 1348 when she inherited the title from her father when she was only four years old. However, she initially remained in Naples rather than going to Durrës when she became Duchess. It wasn't until her Marriage to Louis of Navarre that she began to get involved in the affairs in the Kingdom of Albania.
	^{Duke of Durrës} Louis, Duke of Durazzo	1366–1368,1376	Louis of Évreux, also known as Louis of Navarre, became Duke of Durrës in 1366 through his marriage to Joanna, Duchess of Durazzo. His reign in Albania was marked by efforts to recover the Kingdom of Albania, which included Durrës. With the support of his brother Charles II of Navarre and the King of France, Louis aimed to reclaim Durrës, after being taken by Karl Thopia in 1368. In 1372, he enlisted the assistance of the Navarrese Company of mercenaries, recruiting additional forces in 1375 directly from Navarre. Through strategic military planning and engineering, they successfully captured Durrës in the summer of 1376. However, Louis died shortly after this achievement. Louis and Joanna had no children. Joanna never fully regained full control of Durrës and in 1383 the city was back in the hands of Karl Thopia when the last mercenaries of the Navarrese Company moved to Greece. Louis left behind an illegitimate son, Carlos de Beaumont, who later played a role in the Navarrese Civil War.
	^{Duke of Durrës} Robert IV of Artois, Count of Eu	1376-1383	Robert IV of Artois, became Duke of Durrës in 1376 through his marriage to Joanna, Duchess of Durazzo. His tenure as Duke lasted until 1383, a period marked by political turbulence and conflict. In 1383, Robert's rule in Durrës came to an abrupt end when Karl Thopia, an Albanian nobleman, took control of the city.

== Principality of Muzaka (1279–1450) ==
=== House of Muzaka ===
Picture	^{Title}Name	Reign	Notes
	^{Sebastokrator and Marshal of Albania} Andrea I Muzaka	1279–1319	Received the title Sebastokrator by the Byzantine Emperor and his reign was de facto independent until 1319.
	^{Protosebastus} Teodor I Muzaka	1319–1331	Son of Andrea I Muzaka
	^{Despot of Albania} Andrea II Muzaka	1331–1372	Andrea II, much like his father, fulfilled the role of the Angevins' titular marshal in Albania. Apart from being acknowledged as despotus Regni Albaniae (the despot of the Kingdom of Albania) and Marshal of Albania by the Angevins, he also held several other titles, including sebastokrator.
	^{Prince of Berat} Teodor II Muzaka	1372–1389	Son of Andrea II. Participated in the Battle of Kosovo. Teodor II was in territorial dispute over Kostur with Prince Marko and because this dispute he was commemorated in Serbian epic poetry as Musa Kesedžija.
	^{Lord of Berat} Andrea III Muzaka	1389–1396	Father of Theodor Corona Musachi
	^{Lord of Berat} Teodor III Muzaka	1396–1450	He was an Albanian nobleman who led the 1437–38 revolt against the Ottomans and was one of the founders of the League of Lezhë in 1444.

== Principality of Mataranga (1358–1367) ==
=== House of Mataranga ===
The Mataranga family was a vassel of Charles I of Anjou before 1284. The family was first documented in 1297 by the Republic of Ragusa. The family became a vassal of the Byzantine emperor as well between 1284 and 1288 but then accepted the Angevin overlordship again in 1304.

Picture	^{Title}Name	Reign	Notes
	^{Sebastokrator & Lord of Karavasta} Blasius Mataranga	1358-1367	Blasius established an independent principality from 1358 to 1367 in the Myzeqe region between Durrës and Vlorë. He was recognized as Sebastokrator by Simeon Uroš Palaiologos
	^{Lord of Karavasta} Gjon Mataranga	1367-13??	Son of Blasius, after his father's death, Gjon inherited a small portion of his father's lands.

== Principality of Gjonima (1319–1430) ==
=== House of Gjonima ===
- Dhimitër Gjonima
- Vladislav Gjonima
- Marin Gjonima

== Principality of Albania (1328–1415) ==
=== House of Thopia ===
Picture	^{Title}Name	Reign	Notes
	^{Count of Mat} Tanusio Thopia	1328–1338	Tanusio was recognized as count of Matia.
	^{Count of Mat} Andrea I Thopia	1338–1343	Andrea inherited the county of Mat after Tanusios's death. Andrea had become the son-in-law of the Neapolitan King Robert of Anjou without his consent. It should end up costing him his head. Robert sent his biological daughter Hélène of Anjou, whom he had promised to be a wife to a potentate in Morea, via Durrës to Greece. In the Albanian port city she met Andrea Thopia, they fell in love and got married. The marriage resulted in two sons, Gjergj Thopia and Karl Thopia. However, King Robert did not accept the violation of his will to rule. He invited the couple to Naples on the pretext of wanting to reconcile with them and had them executed there.
	^{Prince of Albania} Karl Thopia	1358–1388	In 1358, Karl rose against the rule of the Anjou and managed to drive them out of Durrës from Epirus and Albania. He ruled most of modern central Albania from 1358 to 1388 and claimed the title of Princeps Albaniae. Karl gained control of Durrës in 1368, which was where the Angevins held out due to their Kingdom becoming smaller. In 1374, Pope Gregory XI awarded him the title "Grande Conte d'Albania" (Grand Count of Albania). Karl lost Durrës in 1376, conquered by Louis, Duke of Durazzo, but recovered it in 1383 when the last mercenaries of the Navarrese Company moved to Greece. Thopia ruled over the regions of Durrës, Kruja, Peqin, Elbasan, Mokra and Gora, that is, along both sides of the Via Egnatia as far east as Lake Ohrid.
	^{Prince of Albania} Gjergj Thopia	1388–1392	Son of Karl Thopia. He succeeded his father after his death. In 1392 he was required to return Durrës to the Republic of Venice. In 1392 and died later that year without issue.
	^{Lady of Krujë} Helena Thopia	1388–1392	Eldest daughter of Karl thopia. She was married to Marco Barbarigo. She inherited Krujë and the surrounding region after her father's death and ruled with her husband. In 1392 her brother Niketa attacked the city and forced them to find refuge with the Balsha family.
	^{Lord of Krujë} Niketa Thopia	1392–1394	He ruled for 2 years until losing Krujë.
	^{Lady of Krujë} Helena Thopia	1394–1403	Married Kostandin Balsha in 1394 and ruled Krujë with her Husband. After Kostandin Balsha's death in 1402 Helena's brother Niketa recaptured the castle from her.
	^{Lord of Krujë} Niketa Thopia	1403–1415	In 1403, Niketa Thopia managed to capture the city of Krujë from his sister, Helena Thopia, thus uniting the principality previously held by another member of the Thopia family. Upon his death in 1415, the castle of Krujë fell into Ottoman hands.

== Principality of Vlorë (1345–1417) ==
=== House of Sratsimir ===
Picture	^{Title}Name	Reign	Notes
	^{Despot of Valona} John Komnenos Asen	1345–1363	John Komnenos Asen, ruling the Principality of Valona from around 1345 to 1363. John assumed power in Valona in late 1345, following the Serbian conquest of south Albania from the Byzantine Empire, concluded by August 1345. This transition marked a significant shift in regional governance, as the local Albanian rulers, who were in power before the Serbian conquest, lost their influence. John was Born into Bulgarian nobility, John's descent from the Asen dynasty and marriage to Anna Palaiologina strengthened his position. He preserved Valona's independence during the Serbian Civil War after Stephen Dušan died in 1355. His reign, marked by economic prosperity and strategic alliances, ended with his death during the 1363 plague, leaving a legacy continued by his son Alexander Komnenos Asen.
	^{Sebastos of Valona} Alexander Komnenos Asen	1363–1372	Alexander Komnenos Asen, son of Despot John Komnenos Asen and nephew of Emperor Ivan Alexander of Bulgaria, inherited the titles of Sebastos of Valona. His rule was characterized by extensive trade with Venice and Ragusa. The circumstances of his death are speculated to be at the Battle of Maritsa on 26 September 1371, as his lands were later controlled by his father-in-law Balša II by 1372.

=== House of Balsha, House of Muzaka & House of Žarković ===
Picture	^{Title}Name	Reign	Notes
	^{Despot of Valona} Balsha II	1372–1385	In 1372, Balsha II wed Comita, the daughter of Andrea II Muzaka. As part of the marriage arrangement, Balsha received the city of Vlorë, as a dowry.
	^{Lady of Valona} Comita Muzaka	1385–1396	After the death of Balsha II, his widow Comita, along with their daughter, assumed control of Balsha's territory in southern Albania to safeguard it from Ottoman threats. Komnina played a significant role as the main ruler of the Duchy of Valona until her demise in 1396. During this period, the Muzaka family took control of Berat. In 1391, Rugjina married Mrkša Žarković, who succeeded as the lord of Valona.
	^{Lord of Valona} Mrkša Žarković	1396–1414	Mrkša Žarković, ruled over Valona from 1396 to 1414. After marrying Rugjina Balsha in 1391 and receiving Valona as part of the dowry, he maintained control until his death. Following Mrkša's demise in October 1414, his wife Rugjina Balsha took control of Valona.
	^{Lady of Valona} Rugjina Balsha	1414–1417	After taking control of Valona. Rugjina sought to transfer her husbands old possessions to the Republic of Venice in 1415 and 1416, but no agreement was reached. The Ottoman Empire eventually conquered Valona and the surrounding region in 1417.

== Principality of Zeta (1356–1421) ==
=== House of Balsha ===
Picture	^{Title}Name	Reign	Notes
	^{Lord of Zeta} Balsha I	1356–1362	Balsha I was a provincial lord of Zeta and the founder of the Balsha noble family. He expanded his power following the death of Stefan Dušan, gaining control of the island of Mljet and lands in Lower Zeta. By 1362, his sons had defeated Đuraš Ilijić, expanding their territory into Upper Zeta. Balsha had three sons, Strazimir Balsha, Gjergj Balsha I, and Balsha II.
	^{Lord of Zeta} Strazimir Balsha	1362–1373	Strazimir Balsha was a Lord of Zeta alongside his brothers. The Balsha family took control of Zeta during the decline of the Serbian Empire. Strazimir supported Ragusa in conflicts and became a Ragusan citizen in 1361. He later took monastic vows and died on 15 January 1373. He left three sons.
	^{Lord of Zeta} Gjergj I Balsha	1362–1378	Gjergj Balsha I was the middle child of three sons of Balsha I and ruled Zeta from 1362 until 13 January 1378. Gjergj waged war against the Thopia family, was captured, and later released through Ragusan mediation. In 1369, he converted to Catholicism to strengthen his coastal ambitions. He attempted to take Kotor and gained territories from Nikola Altomanović through either conquest or negotiation. Gjergj I died in 1378, and his brother Balsha II succeeded him as ruler of Zeta.
	^{Lord of Zeta} Balsha II	1378–1385	Balsha II was the youngest son of Balsha I and ruled Lower Zeta from 1378 to 1385. In 1372, Balsha II married Komnena Asen, gaining control of Valona, Berat, and Kanina. After succeeding his brother Gjergj I in 1378, Balsha II struggled against rival noble families and Venice. In 1385, he captured Durrës but was defeated and killed by the Ottomans at the Battle of Savra. His widow, Komnina, and daughter, Rugjina Balsha, later defended his territories against Ottoman advances.
	^{Lord of Zeta} Gjergj II Balsha	1385–1403	Gjergj Balsha II, was the Lord of Zeta from 1385 to 1403. He is the son of Strazimir Balsha. He inherited Zeta after his uncle Balsha II died. During his reign, Gjergj faced significant challenges, including rebellions, territorial losses, and the growing threat of the Ottoman Empire. He formed strategic alliances, notably with Serbian Prince Lazar Hrebeljanović through marriage. Despite his efforts to maintain control, he lost substantial territories and was briefly imprisoned by the Ottomans. After his death in 1403, he was succeeded by his son, Balsha III.
	^{Lord of Zeta} Balsha III	1403–1421	Balsha III, the last ruler of Zeta reigned from April 1403 to April 1421. He was the son of Gjergj II Balsha. At seventeen, Balsha inherited the throne after his father's death. During his reign, Balsha waged a prolonged conflict with Venice known as the First Scutari War, which saw him lose and then partially regain territories such as Ulcinj, Bar, and Budva. He briefly became a vassal of the Ottoman Turks but continued to contest Venetian control over Dalmatia. In 1412, he successfully recaptured Bar from the Venetians. Balsha's later years were marked by continuous warfare, and he ultimately failed to reclaim Budva. In 1421, he transferred control of Zeta to his uncle, Despot Stefan Lazarević, before his death. Balsha married twice, first to Mara Thopia and then to Boglia Zaharia, and had several children, including Jelena Balsha, who would later marry Stjepan Vukčić Kosača.

== Despotate of Angelokastron and Lepanto (1358–1374) ==
=== Shpata dynasty ===
Picture	^{Title}Name	Reign	Notes
	^{Despot} Gjin Bua Shpata	1358–1374	Gjin Bua Shpata played a significant role in the governance of the territories in Epirus and Aetolia. After the initial Albanian incursion into the region in 1358, Simeon Uroš, recognized Gjin Bua Shpata as a ruler in Epirus and Aetolia around 1358. He shared power with his brother Skurra Bua Shpata. Following the death of Pjetër Losha in 1374, Gjin Bua Shpata took control of Pjeter holdings and united it into the Despotate of Arta

== Despotate of Arta (1360–1416) ==
=== Losha dynasty ===
Picture	^{Title}Name	Reign	Notes
	^{Despot} Pjetër Losha	1360–1374	The first ever ruler of the Despotate of Arta. Pjetër reigned during the Losha dynasty.

=== House of Shpata ===
Picture	^{Title}Name	Reign	Notes
	^{Despot} Gjin Bua Shpata	1374–1399	Gjin started the Shpata dynasty of the Despotate. He united the Albanian Despotates of Arta and Angelocastron after the death of Pjetër Losha.
	^{Lord of Angelokastron} Paul Boua Spata	1403-1407	He was the son of Sgouros Spata and ruled over the cities of Angelokastron and Naupaktos.
	^{Lord of Arta} Skurra Bua Shpata	1399–1403	Brother of Gjin Bua Shpata.
	^{Lord of Arta} Muriq Shpata	1403–1415	Grandson of Gjin Bua Shpata and had one brother Jakob Bua Shpata.
	^{Lord of Arta} Jakob Bua Shpata	1415–1416	The last ruler of the Despotate of Arta.

== Principality of Gjirokastër (1386–1418) ==
=== House of Zenebishi ===
Picture	^{Title}Name	Reign	Notes
	^{Sevastokrator; Lord of Gjirokastër} Gjon Zenebishi	1386-1418	The Zenebishi family is first mentioned in 1304. It was one of the families given privileges by Philip I, Prince of Taranto. Gjon Zenebishi, an Albanian magnate, held estates in Epirus, particularly Gjirokastër and Vagenetia. In the late 14th century, he initially submitted to the Ottomans after their victory against Balsha II but later revolted and seized the fortress of Gjirokastër. He adopted the Byzantine title of sevastokrator and formed alliances with influential figures, including the Despot of Arta, Gjin Bua Shpata.In 1399, he defeated Esau Buondelmonti, the Despot of Epirus, expanding his influence. However, in 1418, Zenebishi was defeated by the Ottomans and fled to the Venetian island of Corfu, where he died. The Ottomans subsequently took control of Gjirokastër. Zenebishi's descendants continued to play roles in regional politics, aligning with various powers such as Naples and Venice.
	^{Lord of Gjirokastër} Depë Zenebishi	1418	He was the rightful lord of Gjirokastër from 1418 to 1434 till he was deposed by the Ottomans. He then was shortly captured and executed in 1436.

== Principality of Dukagjini (1387–1479) ==
=== House of Dukagjini ===
Picture	^{Title}Name	Reign	Notes
	^{Prince of Dukagjini} Pal I Dukagjini	1387–1393	Pal I Dukagjini's rule in 1387 marked a significant period in the formation of the Principality of Dukagjini. As one of the main branches of the Dukagjini family, Pal I and his brother Lekë were described as owners of Lezhë in a Ragusan document from that year. Their role in securing a free pass to Ragusan merchants in their dominion hinted at their emerging influence.
	^{Prince of Dukagjini} Lekë I Dukagjini	1387–????	Lekë I Dukagjini, the brother of Pal I Dukagjini, played a crucial role in the 14th-century Principality of Dukagjini. As part of the Dukagjini family, Lekë and his brother were prominent figures in the late 13th century, with Lekë being mentioned in historical records in 1281. The Dukagjini family evolved from an extended clan to a feudal family, and Lekë's contributions included being an owner of Lezhë.
	^{Prince of Dukagjini} Little Tanush	1393–1413	He was the son of Pal Dukagjini, a prominent figure in the family. Tanush, along with his brothers, played a role in the complex political landscape of the time.
	^{Prince of Dukagjini} Pal II Dukagjini	1413–1446	Pal II Dukagjini, a prominent member of the Dukagjini family, was an Albanian nobleman who, along with his kinsman Nicholas Dukagjini, initially served under Venetian vassal Lekë Zaharia. Actively involved in the League of Lezhë, a 1444 alliance against Ottoman rule, Pal later accepted vassalage under Alfonso V of Aragon in 1454. However, he eventually abandoned Skanderbeg's forces and joined the Ottomans. Pal left a lasting impact with four notable sons, including Nicholas and Lekë, who continued to shape the political landscape of the region.
	^{Prince of Dukagjini} Lekë III Dukagjini	1446–1479	Known for the Kanuni i Lekë Dukagjinit, a legal code observed in northern Albanian tribes, Lekë succeeded his father Pal II Dukagjini in 1446. His principality, stretching from Northern Albania into modern Kosovo, was a key player in the region. Lekë participated in Skanderbeg's military efforts against the Ottoman Empire, but internal conflicts among Albanian nobles were not uncommon during this tumultuous period. Lekë Dukagjini's involvement in hostilities, including the death of Lekë Zaharia, highlighted the complex dynamics. His principality faced challenges, and after Skanderbeg's death, Lekë continued resistance against the Ottomans until 1479, occasionally collaborating with the Venetians.

== Principality of Arianiti (????–1462) ==
=== House of Arianiti ===
Picture	^{Title}Name	Reign	Notes
	Komnen Arianiti	1392–1407	Komnen is the first known monarch of the Arianiti family, but the family has been recorded since the 11th century. He first appears in Venetian archives that he held land by central Albania.
	^{Prince of Arianiti} Gjergj Arianiti	1432-1462	Son of Komnen Arianiti and was a commander during the Albanian-Ottoman wars. He was a very influential figure at the time as he was a part of the League of Lezhë.
	^{Lord of Dibra} Moisi Golemi	14??–1464	He was the only son of Muzakë Arianiti. He married Zanfina Muzaka and had two sons and four daughters. He was an important figure who was involved in the Albanian Ottoman wars and was distinguished in the Battle of Torvioll. His domains Extended from Mokër and Çermenikë. And many other areas he inherited from his father. He was acknowledged as Lord of Dibra by Skanderbeg as well.

== Principality of Kastrioti (1389–1444) ==
=== House of Kastrioti ===
Picture	^{Title}Name	Reign	Notes
	^{Ruler of Mat and Dibër} Pal Kastrioti	1389–1407	First ruler of the Principality of Kastrioti.
	^{Lord of Mat} Gjon Kastrioti	1407–1437	Strategically navigated the political landscape by forming alliances with major powers such as Venice and the Ottoman Empire. His diplomacy and military leadership were instrumental in expanding and consolidating the territorial influence of the Kastrioti family. He was able to maintain stability in the principality.
	^{Dominus Albaniae} Gjergj Kastrioti	1443–1468	Renowned for his military leadership, he successfully resisted Ottoman expansion into Albania for over two decades, earning widespread recognition as a national hero. Skanderbeg played a central role in the formation of the League of Lezhë, rallying Albanian nobility in a military and diplomatic alliance against the Ottoman Empire. On 2 March 1444, at the assembly of Lezhë, Skanderbeg was proclaimed "Chief of the League of the Albanian People," uniting regional chieftains and nobles to resist Ottoman expansion under his leadership.

== Principality of Zaharia (1396–1447) ==
=== House of Zaharia ===
Picture	^{Title}Name	Reign	Notes
	^{Lord of Sati and Dagnum} Koja Zaharia	1396–1430	Koja Zaharia himself is mentioned from 1396 when he captured the castle of Dagnum and declared himself a vassal of the Ottomans. In 1412, Koja's daughter married Balša III, and Koja was appointed as castellan of Budva. After the death of Balša III, Koja's daughter Boglia together with her two daughters returned to her family in Dagnum. After the capture of Dagnum by Ishak Bey in 1430, Koja was either imprisoned or expelled. His son, Lekë Zaharia, later assumed the position of Dagnum's governor after the Albanian Revolt of 1432–1436.
	^{Lord of Sati and Dagnum} Lekë Zaharia	1430–1447	Lekë Zaharia's rule was marked by his involvement in the League of Lezhë, a significant alliance formed in 1444 by various Albanian nobles. Lekë Zaharia played a key role in the league's establishment. However, his rule was cut short by his untimely death in 1444 during a dispute with Lekë Dukagjini over a woman named Irene Dushmani. This dispute led to Lekë Zaharia's murder, with accusations initially placed on Lekë Dukagjini, though some sources, like Venetian chronicler Stefano Magno, attributed the act to Nicholas Dukagjin, Zaharia's vassal. Before his death, Lekë Zaharia expressed a desire to hand over his properties to the Venetian Republic. The aftermath of his demise saw the fortress of Dagnum, claimed by Skanderbeg in the name of the League of Lezhë, being surrendered to the Venetian Republic by Lekë Zaharia's mother. This event triggered the Albanian–Venetian War, concluding with the castle remaining in Venetian hands, paying an annual tribute to Skanderbeg.

== Principality of Spani (1400–1442) ==
=== House of Spani ===
- Pjetër I Spani
- Stefan Spani
- Marin Spani

== Principality of Dushmani (1402–1444) ==
=== House of Dushmani ===
- Pal Dushmani
- Lekë Dushmani
- Koja Dushmani

== League of Lezhë (1444–1479) ==
=== House of Kastrioti ===
Picture	^{Title}Name	Reign	Notes
	^{Dominus Albaniae} Gjergj Kastrioti	1444–1468	Skanderbeg initiated the League of Lezhë in 1444 by bringing together prominent Albanian noble families in the city of Lezhë. Proclaiming himself "Chief of the League of the Albanian People," Skanderbeg secured the support of the Albanian nobles forming a unified front against the Ottoman Empire.

=== House of Dukagjini ===
Picture	^{Title}Name	Reign	Notes
	^{Prince of Dukagjini} Lekë Dukagjini	1468–1479	As the last ruler of the League of Lezhë, Lekë played a pivotal role in sustaining Albanian resistance against the Ottoman Empire after Skanderbeg's death in 1468. Despite facing internal challenges and the ultimate capture of Shkodër by the Ottomans in 1479, Dukagjini's leadership contributed significantly to the league's efforts to maintain independence and resist Ottoman conquest.

== Pashalik of Shkodra (1757–1831) ==
=== House of Bushati ===
Picture	^{Title}Name	Reign	Notes
	^{Pasha of Shkodra} Mehmed Bushati	1757–1774	Mehmed Pasha Bushati held sway over the Pashalik of Scutari during the late 1700s amid the Ottoman Empire's decline. Leading from 1757 to 1831, he navigated the complexities of the time, seeking aid from the Habsburgs against the Ottomans and negotiating with the Sultan for pardon. His rule witnessed military campaigns, including clashes with Ahmet Kurt Pasha over territories like Durrës.
	^{Pasha of Shkodra} Kara Mahmud Pasha	1775–1796	Kara Mahmud Pasha's rule was characterized by dynamic military campaigns, strategic alliances, and political maneuvering in the late 18th century Ottoman Empire. As the hereditary governor of the Pashalik of Scutari, he engaged in conflicts against Greek rebels, Montenegro, and Venetians. His rivalry with Ahmet Kurt Pasha of Berat led to sieges, civil wars, and regional power shifts. Mahmud expanded his influence over Southern Albania and Kosovo, entertaining aspirations of an independent state. Despite facing opposition from the Ottoman Empire, he adeptly navigated diplomatic challenges, even considering alliances with Austria-Hungary and Russia. Known for his audacious leadership, Mahmud's legacy endured through folkloric songs, with his death in 1796 halting ambitious plans for a Western Balkan conquest.
	^{Pasha of Shkodra} Ibrahim Pasha of Scutari	1796–1810	Serving as the brother of Kara Mahmud Bushati, the Ottoman-appointed governor of Shkodër, Ibrahim held the position of Beylebey of Rumelia in 1805. During his rule, he actively participated in the suppression of the First Serbian Uprising led by Karađorđe Petrović after the Battle of Ivankovac. Ibrahim Bushati's leadership extended beyond Shkodra, as he collaborated with Ali Pasha and even commanded Ali Pasha's sons Muktar Pasha and Veil Pasha in 1806. Facing the challenges of a turbulent period, especially in the aftermath of the First Serbian Uprising, Ibrahim maintained close ties with the Ottoman Empire until he died in 1810.
	^{Pasha of Shkodra} Mustafa Pasha Bushatli	1810–1831	Mustafa Pasha Bushatli, the last pasha of the Pashalik of Scutari, assumed leadership in 1810, succeeding his uncle Ibrahim Pasha. His rule saw military engagements, including involvement in the Greek War of Independence in 1823. Mustafa resisted Ottoman reforms, leading to a rebellion in 1831, resulting in his surrender and subsequent service as a governor in different Ottoman territories until he died in 1860.

== Pashalik of Berat (1774–1809) ==
=== House of Berat ===
Picture	^{Title}Name	Reign	Notes
	^{Pasha of Berat} Ahmet Kurt Pasha	1774–1787	Ahmet Kurt Pasha was instrumental in the creation of the Pashalik of Berat in 1774, located in central Albania. He gained favor with the Sublime Porte by plotting against Mehmed Pasha Bushati. As a reward, he received territories in central Albania. Ahmet Kurt Pasha expanded his pashalik until he died in 1787, encompassing much of central Albania. He was the grandfather of Ali Pasha and the father of Ali's mother, Hanka. Ahmet Kurt Pasha's legacy laid the foundation for the subsequent rule and expansion of the Pashalik of Berat. The Pashalik operated with a remarkable degree of autonomy. The region's economic activities and governance reflected a self-sufficient and autonomous character during this period.
	^{Pasha of Berat} Ibrahim Pasha of Berat	1787–1809	Ibrahim Pasha of Berat succeeded Ahmet Kurt Pasha and faced rivalry with Ali Pasha of Ioannina over the Pashalik. The conflict led to armed confrontations and, in 1808, Ali Pasha's victory, resulting in the incorporation of Berat's territory into the Pashalik of Janina. Despite the political changes, local autonomy persisted. The local economy, centered around activities like maize cultivation, reflected a degree of self-governance amid the shifting political landscape.

== Pashalik of Ioannina (1788–1822) ==
=== House of Meçohysaj ===
Picture	^{Title}Name	Reign	Notes
	^{Pasha of Yanina} Ali Pasha of Ioannina	1788–1822	Ali Pasha, an Ottoman Albanian ruler, began his rise to power in the late 18th century. He initially gained control of Delvina in 1785, becoming the ruler of the Sanjak of Delvina. Over the years, he expanded his influence by annexing regions like Konitsa, Libohovë, Përmet, and Tepelenë. In 1787 or 1788, he seized Ioannina and declared himself the ruler of the sanjak, establishing the Pashalik of Yanina. The Pashalik of Yanina became a semi-independent entity within the Ottoman Empire, with a high degree of autonomy.

== Principality of Albania (1914-1925) ==
=== House of Wied ===
#	Name	Portrait	Birth and death	Reign started	Reign ended	Marriages	Succession right
1	William		26 March 1876; Neuwied (German Empire) – 18 April 1945; Predeal (Romania) (aged 69)	7 March 1914	3 September 1914 (de facto); 31 January 1925 (de jure)	Princess Sophie; 30 November 1906 [2 children]	

=== Heads of House of Wied (1914–1973, not ruling) ===
#	Name	Portrait	Birth and death	Reign started	Reign ended	Marriages	Succession right
1	William		26 March 1876; Neuwied (German Empire) – 18 April 1945; Predeal (Romania) (aged 69)	3 September 1914	18 April 1945	Princess Sophie; 30 November 1906 [2 children]	
2	Carol Victor		19 May 1913; Potsdam (Kingdom of Prussia) – 8 December 1973; Munich (West Germany) (aged 60)	18 April 1945	8 December 1973	Princess Eileen; 8 September 1966 [childless]	Son of William

== Albanian Kingdom (1928–1939) ==
=== House of Zogu ===
#	Name	Portrait	Birth and death	Reign started	Reign ended	Marriages	Succession right
1	Zog I		8 October 1895; Burgajet Castle (Ottoman Empire) – 9 April 1961; Suresnes (France) (aged 65)	1 September 1928	7 April 1939	Queen Geraldine; April 1938 [1 child]	

=== House of Zogu (1939–1945) ===
#	Name	Portrait	Birth and death	Reign started	Reign ended	Marriages	Succession right
1	Zog I		8 October 1895; Burgajet Castle (Ottoman Empire) – 9 April 1961; Suresnes (France) (aged 65)	7 April 1939 (as king in exile)	9 April 1961 (in exile)	Queen Geraldine; April 1938 [1 child]	

== Italian Occupied Albanian Kingdom (1939–1943) ==
=== House of Savoy ===
#	Name	Portrait	Birth and death	Reign started	Reign ended	Marriages	Succession right
1	Victor Emmanuel III		11 November 1869; Naples (Kingdom of Italy) – 28 December 1947; Alexandria (Egypt) (aged 78)	16 April 1939	8 September 1943	Queen Elena; 24 October 1896 [5 children]	renounced the throne

== See also ==
- List of Albanian royal consorts
- King of Albania
- Regalia of Albania
- List of Albanian royal residences
- List of former capitals of Albania

== Bibliography ==
- Elsie, Robert (2003). Early Albania A Reader of Historical Texts, 11th-17th Centuries. Harrassowitz. ISBN 978-3-4470-4783-8.
- Fine, John V. A. (1994). The Late Medieval Balkans: A Critical Survey from the Late Twelfth Century to the Ottoman Conquest. University of Michigan Press. ISBN 978-0-4720-8260-5.
- Hopf, Karl (1873). Chroniques greco-romanes inedites ou peu connues [Unpublished or little-known Greco-Roman chronicles] (in French). Weidmann.
- Jacques, Edwin E. (2009). The Albanians: An Ethnic History from Prehistoric Times to the Present - Volume 1. McFarland & Company. ISBN 978-0-8995-0932-7.
- Lamprecht, Karl (1877). Allgemeine Staatengeschichte vom lateinischen Kreuzzuge bis zur Vollendung der osmanischen Eroberung : 1204 - 1470 [General state history from the Latin Crusades to the completion of the Ottoman conquest: 1204 - 1470] (in German). Perthes.
- Molina, Grabiela Rojas (2022). Decoding Debate in the Venetian Senate Short Stories of Crisis and Response on Albania (1392-1402). Brill. ISBN 978-9-0045-2093-6.
- Monarkia Shqiptare 1928–1939, Qendra e Studimeve Albanologjike & Insitituti Historisë, Boetimet Toena, Tirana, 2011 (ISBN 978-99943-1-721-9)
- O'Connell, Monique (2009). Men of Empire Power and Negotiation in Venice's Maritime State. Johns Hopkins University Press. ISBN 978-0-8018-9145-8.
- Patrice Najbor, Histoire de l'Albanie et de sa maison royale (5 volumes), JePublie, Paris, 2008, (ISBN 978-2-9532382-0-4).
- Patrice Najbor, La dynastye des Zogu, Textes & Prétextes, Paris, 2002.
- Sainty, Guy Stair (2018). The Constantinian Order of Saint George and the Angeli, Farnese and Bourbon families which governed it. Boletín Oficial del Estado. ISBN 978-8-4340-2506-6.
- Schmitt, Oliver Jens; Fischer, Bernd J. (2022). A Concise History of Albania. Cambridge University Press. ISBN 978-1-1076-6218-6.
- Soulis, George Christos (1984). The Serbs and Byzantium During the Reign of Tsar Stephen Dušan (1331-1355) and His Successors. Dumbarton Oaks Library and Collection. ISBN 978-0-8840-2137-7.
- Šufflay, Milan (2012). Serbs and Albanians Their Symbiosis in the Middle Ages. GPX Alerion LLC. ISBN 978-0-9887-1292-8.
- Veselinović, Andrija; Ljušić, Radoš (2002). Rodoslovi srpskih dinastija [Genealogies of Serbian dynasties] (in Serbian). Platoneum. ISBN 978-8-6836-3902-1.
