= Christianization of Albania =

Conversion of early Albania to Christianity

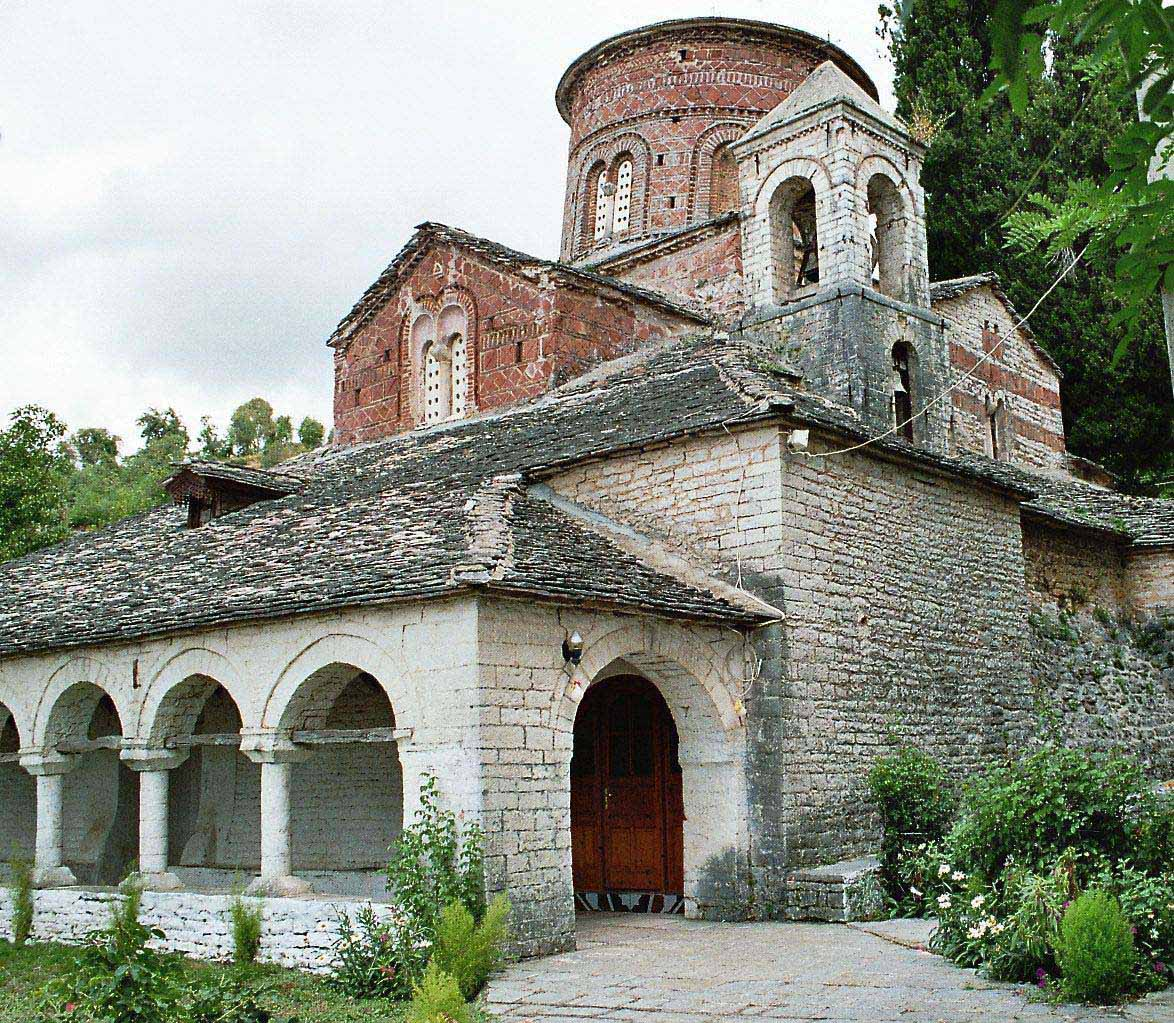
- Church of the Dormition of the Theotokos, Labovë e Kryqit in Albania is one of the oldest churches in the country and a symbol of Christianization.
- Native name: Krishtërizmi e Shqiperisë
- Date: 58 AD – 3rd Century
- Location: Modern-day Albania
- Outcome: Albania converts to Christianity

The Christianization of Albania (Albanian: Krishtërizimi e Shqiperisë) was a process where the people who inhabited early Albania during late antiquity and the early middle ages converted to Christianity. Before this process of mass-conversion, a majority of the people in the lands of modern-day Albania either followed old Illyrian religion or practiced ancient Greek religion. The christianization of Albania also had a large impact on the culture, history, society and government.

== Arrival of the church in Albania ==
Christianity in Albania began when Christians arrived in Illyria soon after the time of Jesus, with a bishop being appointed in Dyrrhachium (Epidamnus) in 58 AD. Christianity also came to Epirus nova, then part of the Roman province of Macedonia. In Romans 15:19, Saint Paul writes,"by the power of signs and wonders, and by the power of the Spirit of God. So from Jerusalem all the way around to Illyricum, I have fully proclaimed the gospel of Christ” which indicates that the lands of Illyria had been Christianized. Since the 3rd and 4th century AD, Christianity had become the established religion in Byzantium, supplanting pagan polytheism and eclipsing for the most part the humanistic world outlook and institutions inherited from the Greek and Roman civilizations. The Durrës Amphitheatre (Albanian: Amfiteatri i Durrësit) is a historic monument from the time period located in Durrës, Albania, that was used to preach Christianity to civilians during that time. When the Roman Empire was divided into eastern and western halves in AD 395, Illyria east of the Drinus River (Drina between Bosnia and Serbia), including the lands form Albania, were administered by the Eastern Empire but were ecclesiastically dependent on Rome.

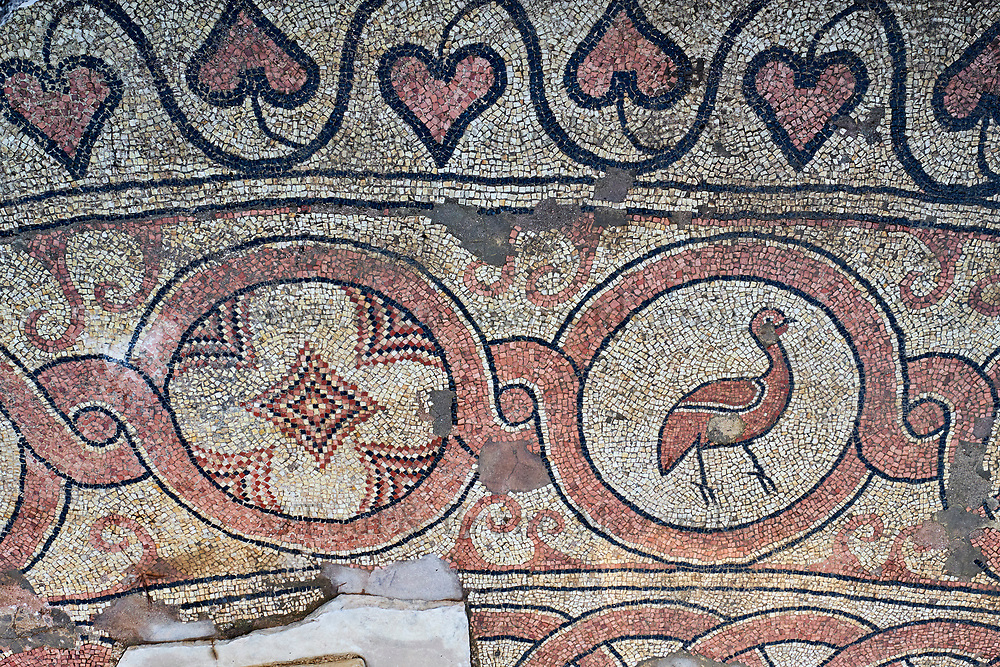
5th century decorative mosaic on the floor of the Baptistery of Butrint.

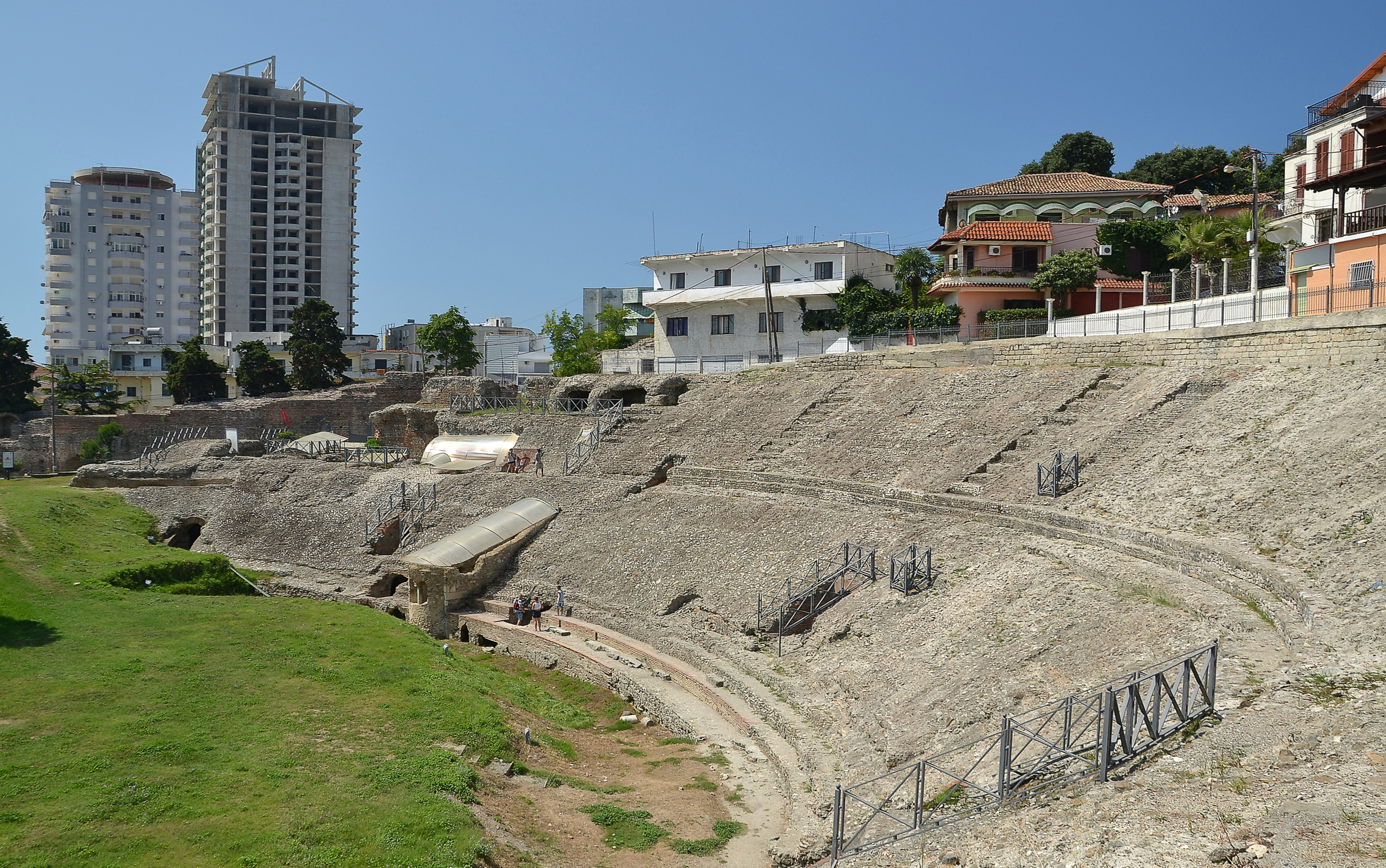
A Roman construction of the Durrës Amphitheatre which was later turned into a chapel in the 4th-century.

Though the country was in the fold of Byzantium, Christians in the region remained under the jurisdiction of the Pope until 732. In that year the iconoclast Byzantine emperor Leo III, angered by archbishops of the region because they had supported Rome in the Iconoclastic Controversy, detached the church of the province from the Roman pope and placed it under the patriarch of Constantinople.

== Great schism of 1054 ==
During the East–West Schism, Christianity was divided between the Roman Catholic Church administrated by the Pope and the Eastern Orthodox Church. The region of southern Albania retained its ties to Constantinople, while the north reverted to the jurisdiction of Rome. This split marked the first significant religious fragmentation of the country. After the formation of the Slav principality of Dioclia (modern Montenegro), the metropolitan see of Bar was created in 1089, and dioceses in northern Albania (Shkodër, Ulcinj) became its suffragans. Starting in 1019, Albanian dioceses of the Byzantine rite were suffragans of the independent Archdiocese of Ohrid until Dyrrachion and Nicopolis, were re-established as metropolitan sees. Thereafter, only the dioceses in inner Albania (Elbasan, Krujë) remained attached to Ohrid. In the 13th century during the Venetian occupation, the Latin Archdiocese of Durrës was founded.

== Church in Albania during the Middle Ages ==
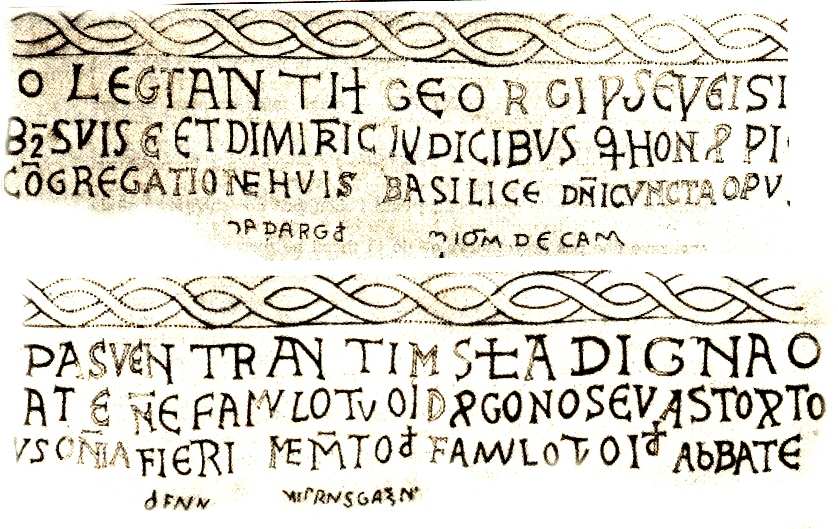
The Geziq inscription which mentions of the acceptation of Dhimitër Progoni into the Catholic Church.

The church in Albania during the Middle Ages was evenly split between the Roman Catholic and Eastern Orthodox churches. The Arbanasi (old south Slavic term for Albanians) are recorded as being 'half-believers' and speaking their own language in a Bulgarian text found in a Serbian manuscript dating to 1628; the text was written by an anonymous author that according to Radoslav Grujić (1934) dated to the reign of Samuel of Bulgaria (997–1014), or possibly, according to R. Elsie, 1000–1018. In 1166, we know that prior Arbanensis Andrea and episcopis Arbanensis Lazarus who were the Bishops of Arbanum participated in a Roman Catholic ceremony held in Kotor.

A year later in 1167, Pope Alexander III, in a letter directed to Lazarus, congratulates him for returning his bishopric to Catholic faith and invites him to acknowledge the archbishop of Ragusa as his superior. After some resistance from local officials, the bishopric of Arbanon was put under the direct dependence of the Pope, as documented in a Papal letter dated in 1188. Later according to the Geziq inscription, Demetrio Progoni, who had been reaccepted in the Catholic Church, had provided funds for the building of the church, which he might have planned to become the seat of the Diocese of Arbanum or a new diocese in the centre of his remaining domain. This is indicated by the fact that the new church was constructed on the site of an older church dedicated to St. Mary (Shën Mëri) but Progoni dedicated the new church to Shën Premte, the patron saint of Arbanum. He had maintained the semi-independence of this area under an agreement in which he accepted the high suzerainty of Zeta and the rulers of Zeta didn't get involved in internal affairs of the region in return. In the inscription which also serves as the last will of Progoni, the church is dedicated to his people (nationi obtulit) and his successor is designated, Progon - son of Gjin Progoni - as protosebastos. The Greek-Albanian Lord of Krujë Gregorios Kamonas married Komnena Nemanjić and strengthened his ties with Serbia and securing Arbanon in an orthodox alliance thus putting Albania under orthodox control. From the dissolution of the principality of Arbanon, Albania became under the rule of the Albanian principalities who ruled under multiple different families and each family was either Roman Catholic, Eastern Orthodox or Muslim depending on what threatened their political influence and existence.

== See also ==
- Christianity in Albania
- Arbanum
- Amphitheatre of Durrës
- Religion in Albania
