= Gjin Tanushi =

13th century Albanian nobleman

Gjin Tanushi (fl. 1281 CE) was a 13th-century Albanian nobleman who held lands in Ndërfandë, corresponding to the region of Mirdita in north-central Albania. He was also the progenitor of the Dukagjini family which ruled over an area of northern Albania and western Kosovo (Rrafshi i Dukagjinit) during the medieval period, their most important holding being that of Lezhë.

== History ==
Gjin Tanushi (recorded as ducam Ginium Tanuschium Albanensem and Johanes Tanusius) first appears in the historical record in an Angevin document from 1281 as among the Albanian nobles (including Vlado Blinishti among others) who had opposed Charles I of Anjou and were consequently imprisoned in Brindisi, having been captured by the captain (miles capitaneus) of Durazzo, Johannes Scoctus. The title attributed to Gjin Tanushi in the document, duca (duke), may represent a position that he earned while serving as a military leader under the Byzantine Empire or Kingdom of Serbia. Following his return to Albania, Gjin Tanushi was killed by the locals of Ndërfanda. The death of Gjin Tanushi is discussed in an account written by Gjon Muzaka (fl. 1510) and contemporary oral traditions from the region. According to these narratives, Gjin Tanushi had killed the bishop of Ndërfanda at the church of Saint Mary as the bishop had dishonoured Tanushi by greedily looking upon his wife. Upon hearing of this, the locals of Ndërfanda rose upon against Gjin Tanushi and killed him as well as his entire household, with only a single son avoiding death by hiding. This unnamed son was adopted and raised by an ally of Tanushi named Stefan Progani from the village of Kallmet, who later married his daughter to Gjin Tanushi's son and aided him in retaking his fathers domain - re-establishing the Dukagjini as a power in the region.

While little is known about Gjin Tanushi's earlier life, some historians have theorised that he was a descendant or relative of the Progoni family which ruled the Principality of Arbanon from 1190 to 1215–6. Injac Zamputi proposed that Tanushi may have been a descendant of protosebastos Progon, the son of Gjin Progoni, who succeeded his uncle Demetrio Progoni and inherited lands in Ndërfanda.
