= Progon =

Progon is a native Albanian name. It is found as a personal name and toponym. Its forms include Progër and Progjen.

People with the name include:

- Progoni family, who established the first documented Albanian state, the Principality of Arbanon
- Progon, Lord of Kruja, a late 12th-century Byzantine-Albanian lord and first known Albanian ruler
- Progonos Sgouros, a Byzantine Albanian senior military commander

== See also ==
- Progonat, a village in the Kurvelesh region, whose name contains the Albanian suffix -at, commonly used in toponyms
- Progër, a village near Korçë
