= Arbano =

Arbano may refer to the following places and Latin Catholic jurisdictions :

- Curiate Italian for Arbanum, a titular bishopric and former diocese in Albania
- Roman dialect for Albano Laziale, town and seat of a Surburbicarian diocese in Lazio, central Italy
