= Demetrio Progoni =

Prince of Albania from 1208 to 1216

Demetrio Progoni Dhimitër Progoni
- Prince of Arbanon; Prince of the Albanians; Panhypersebastos
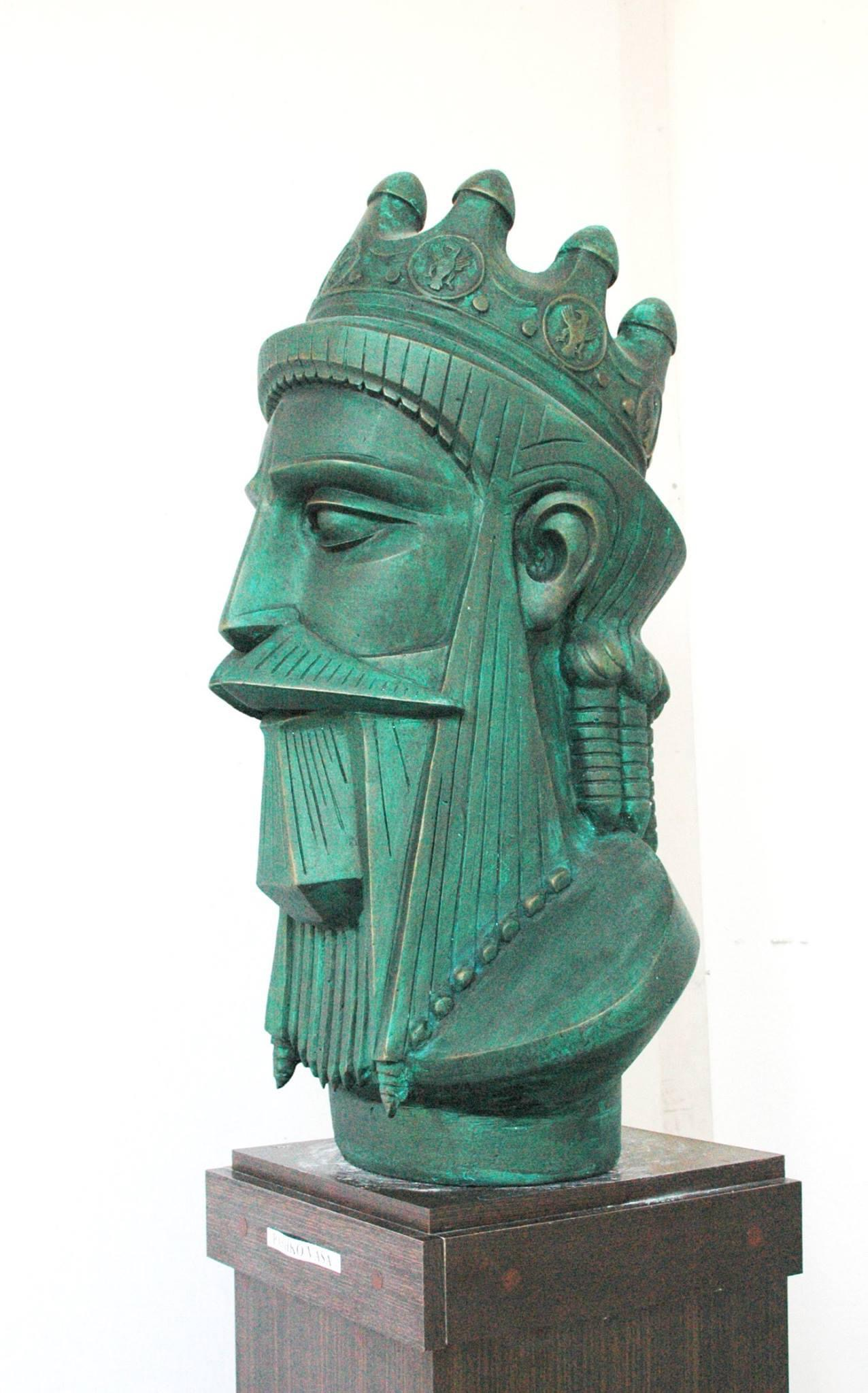
- Bust of Dhimitër Progoni

Prince of Arbanon
- Reign: 1208–1216
- Predecessor: Gjin Progoni (as Lord of Krujë)
- Successor: Grigor Kamona (as Lord of Krujë)
- Born: Unknown
- Died: c. 1215
- Spouse: Komnena Nemanjić (m. 1208)
- House: Progoni
- Father: Progon, Lord of Kruja
- Religion: Roman Catholic by the end of his life.

Demetrio Progoni (Albanian: Dhimitër Progoni) was an Albanian leader who ruled as Prince of the Albanians from 1208 to 1216 the Principality of Arbanon, the first Albanian quasi state. He was the successor and brother of Gjin Progoni and their father, Progon of Kruja. Following the collapse of the Byzantine Empire in the Fourth Crusade, he managed to further secure the independence of Arbanon and extended its influence to its maximum height. Throughout much his rule he was in struggle against the Republic of Venice, Zeta of Đorđe Nemanjić and later the Despotate of Epiros and inversely, maintained good relations with their rivals, the Republic of Ragusa, and at first Stefan Nemanjić of Raška, whose daughter Komnena he married. The Gëziq inscription found in the Catholic church of Ndërfandë (modern Gëziq) shows that by the end of his life he was a Catholic. In Latin documents, of the time, he is often styled as princeps Arbanorum (prince of the Albanians) and in Byzantine documents as megas archon and later as Panhypersebastos. Under increasing pressure from the Despotate of Epiros, his death around 1216 marks the end of Arbanon as a state and the beginning of a period of autonomy until its final ruler Golem of Kruja joined the Nicaean Empire. The annexation sparked the Rebellion of Arbanon in 1257. He didn't have any sons to continue his dynasty, but his wealth and a part of his domain in Mirdita passed after Demetrio's death to his underage nephew, Progon (son of Gjin), whom he named protosevastos. The Dukagjini family which appeared in historical record 70 years later in the same region may have been relatives or direct descendants of the Progoni.

In historical record, Dhimitër Progoni is the first ruler to call himself Prince of the Albanians and the first to identify his domain as Principatum Albaniae (Principality of Albania/Arbanon). Many later feudal rulers of Albania would lay claim to the same title and present their rule as the continuation of this state. The first to do so was Charles I of Anjou who sought to legitimise the Kingdom of Albania as a descendant state of the Principality of Arbanon about 60 years later, in 1272.

== Background ==
Progon of Kruja, father of Dhimitër Progoni formed the first Albanian state during the Middle Ages. Little is known about archon Progon who ruled Krujë and its surroundings at least since the era between 1190 and 1198. The Krujë castle and other territories remained in the possession of the Progoni family, and Progon was succeeded by his sons Gjin, and later Demetrio. Before 1204, Arbanon was an autonomous principality of the Byzantine Empire. The fall of the Byzantine Empire in 1204, had two main political consequences for the region of Albania. The first was that Byzantine overlordship had crumbled, which allowed for the local rulers to seek independence. The second was that in accordance to the agreements about the partition of the Byzantine Empire, control of Albania had been awarded to the Republic of Venice. In this geopolitical environment, Dhimitër Progoni assumed power in 1207–08. In primary sources of the period, he is mostly referred to as Demetrius (Demetrius, Progoni archontis filius et successor) or Demetrio Progoni.

== Rule ==
=== Early Reign ===
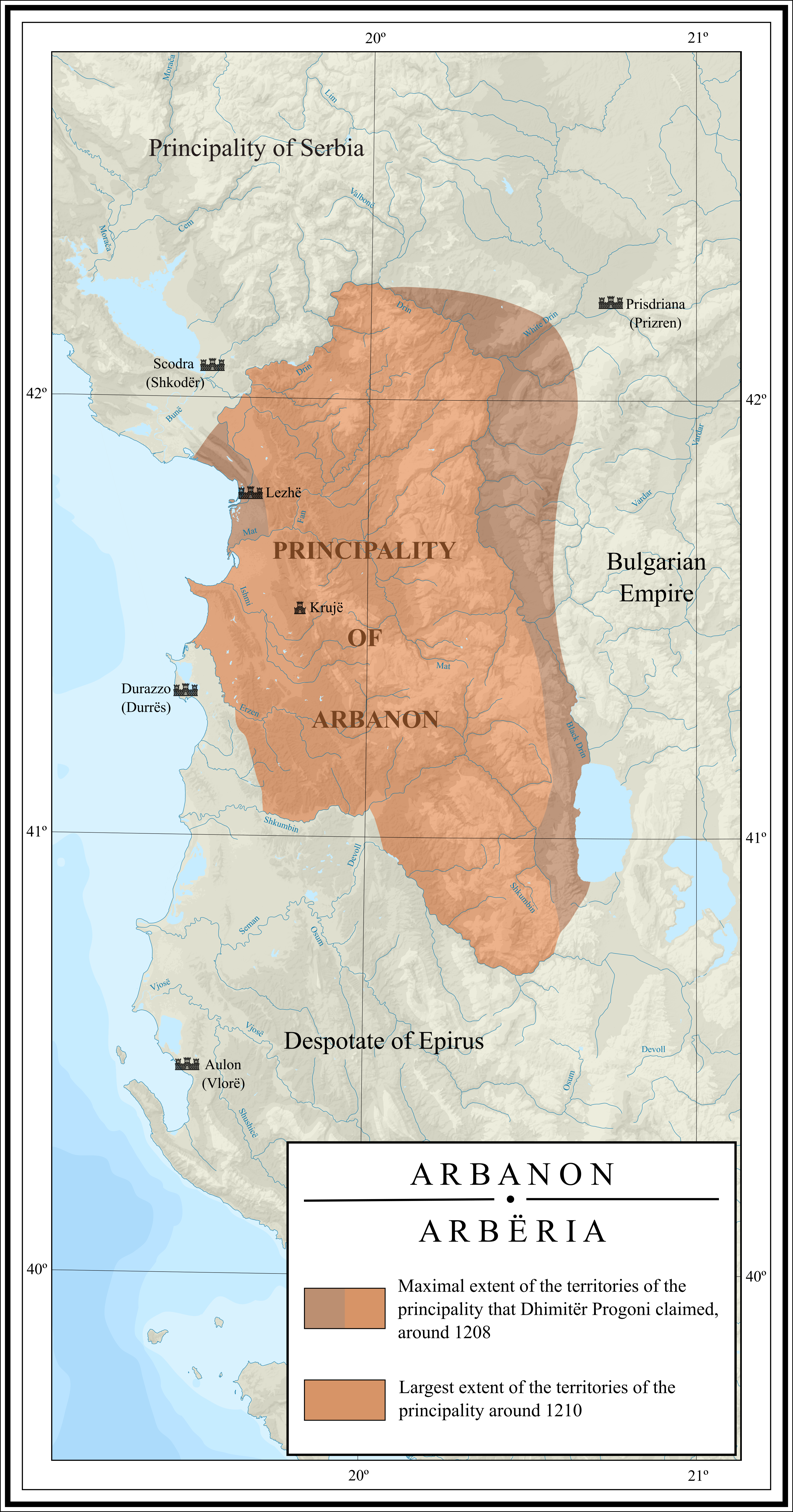
Maximum extent of Arbanon and claims of Dhimitër Progoni

Since the beginning of his rule, Progoni sought out to create friendly networks in foreign policy in order to preserve the sovereignty of Arbanon against external threats, the most important of whom were for much of his reign the Republic of Venice and later the Despotate of Epiros. In 1208–09, he considered conversion to Catholicism from Eastern Orthodoxy for the first time in order to obtain support against his Venetian rivals as well as prevent cultural assimilation by his Eastern Orthodox neighbours. As Venice had been given the nominal rights to control Albania, conversion to Catholicism would nullify Venetian claims over territory controlled by another Catholic state, the Principality of Arbanon. It would also protect him from expansion by post-Byzantine successor states like the Despotate of Epiros. In his preserved correspondence with Pope Innocent III, Progoni as leader of the iudices of Arbanon, who signed as his followers, asked the Pope to send a legate to his court to instruct him on the Catholic faith. The Pope responded that Nicolaus, the Catholic archdeacon of Durrës had been instructed to make preparations for the mission. Shortly after, however, Demetrio stopped the process because he didn't consider it important any longer. He had defeated Đorđe Nemanjić, the Grand prince of Zeta and a Venetian vassal whom he bordered to the north and thus felt less threatened by Venice. Nemanjić had previously promised military support to Venice if Progoni attacked Venetian territory, in a treaty signed on 3 July 1208. He also had secured a marriage with Komnena Nemanjić, who was both the daughter of Stefan Nemanjić, rival of Đorđe Nemanjić and granddaughter of the last Byzantine Emperor Alexios III Angelos. In this context, because of the relation of his consort to the Byzantine imperial family, he was recognized by the title of panhypersevastos. After the death of the Catholic archbishop of Durrës, the Venetians and Progoni - each in their respective territories - seized church property. For his actions against church property, he was excommunicated.

=== Alliance with the Ragusans ===
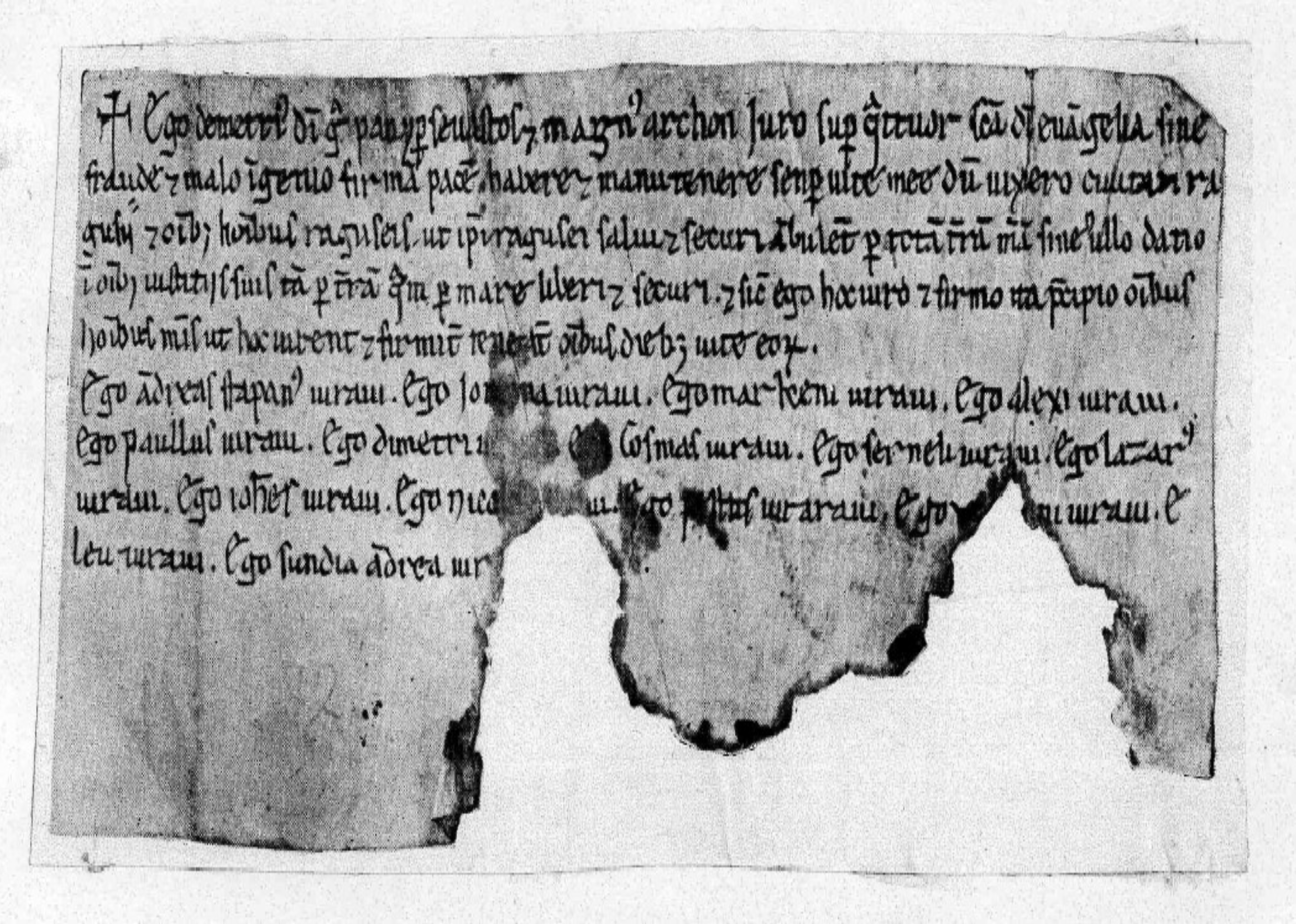
Reproduction of the 1210 Commercial Agreement between Dhimitër Progoni of Arbanon and the Republic of Ragusa.

In search for allies, he also signed a treaty with the Republic of Ragusa which allowed for free passage of Ragusan merchants in Albanian territory. In 1210, an agreement was concluded between the Republic of Venice and Michael I Komnenos Doukas of the Despotate of Epiros under which Doukas would become a vassal of Venice, if the republic recognized his claims up to the Shkumbin river valley, a core area of Arbanon. In 1212, Venice also allowed for the possession of the coastal duchy of Durrës to pass to Michael and abandoned its direct control of central Albania. The agreement had dire consequences for the principality, which surrounded by hostile forces, seems to have been reduced by the end of the life of Dhimitër Progoni to the area north of Shkumbin and south of Drin.

=== Re-acceptance into the Catholic Church ===
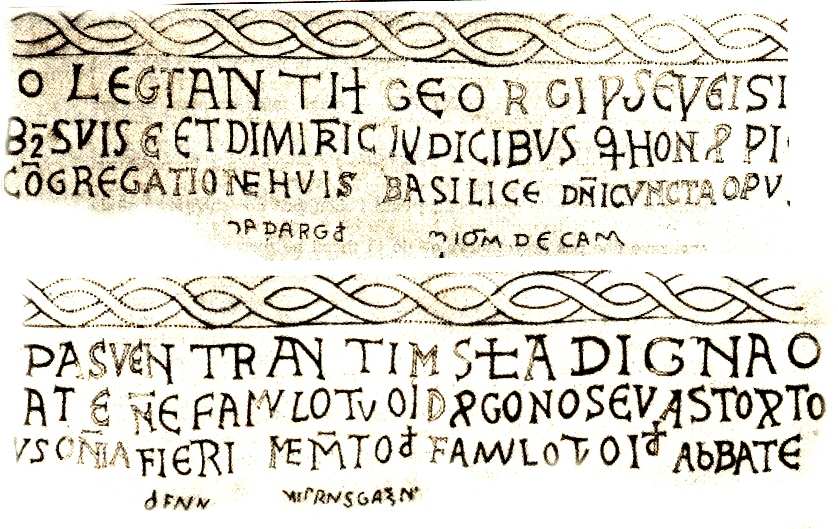
Medieval inscription from the Catholic Church in Albania.

Evidence for Progoni's re-acceptance into the Catholic church has been provided by the foundational inscription of the Catholic church of Gëziq in the Ndërfandë near modern Rreshen in Mirdita. The inscription is written in Latin and has been produced after Progoni's death. The inscription shows that Progoni, who had been reaccepted in the Catholic Church, had provided funds for the building of the church, which he might have planned to become the seat of the Diocese of Arbanum or a new diocese in the centre of his remaining domain.

This is indicated by the fact that the new church was built on the site of an older church dedicated to St. Mary but Progoni dedicated the new church to Shën Premte, the patron saint of Arbanum. He had maintained the semi-independence of this area under an agreement in which he accepted the high suzerainty of Zeta and the rulers of Zeta didn't get involved in internal affairs of the region in return. In the inscription which also serves as the last will of Progoni, the church is dedicated to his people (nationi obtulit) and his successor is designated, Progon - son of Gjin Progoni - as protosevastos.

=== Titles and Domains ===
He used the title princeps Arbanorum ("prince of the Albanians") to refer to himself and was recognized as such by foreign dignitaries. In the correspondence with Innocent III, the territory he claimed as princeps Arbanorum was the area between Shkodra, Prizren, Ohrid and Durrës (regionis montosae inter Scodram, Dyrrachium, Achridam et Prizrenam sitae). In general, Progoni brought the principality to its climax. The area the principality controlled, ranged from the Shkumbin river valley to the Drin river valley in the north and from the Adriatic sea to the Black Drin in the east. In Latin documents, he is also referred to as iudex. In Byzantine records, he is titled as megas archon and after the consolidation of his rule as panhypersebastos.

== Death and legacy ==
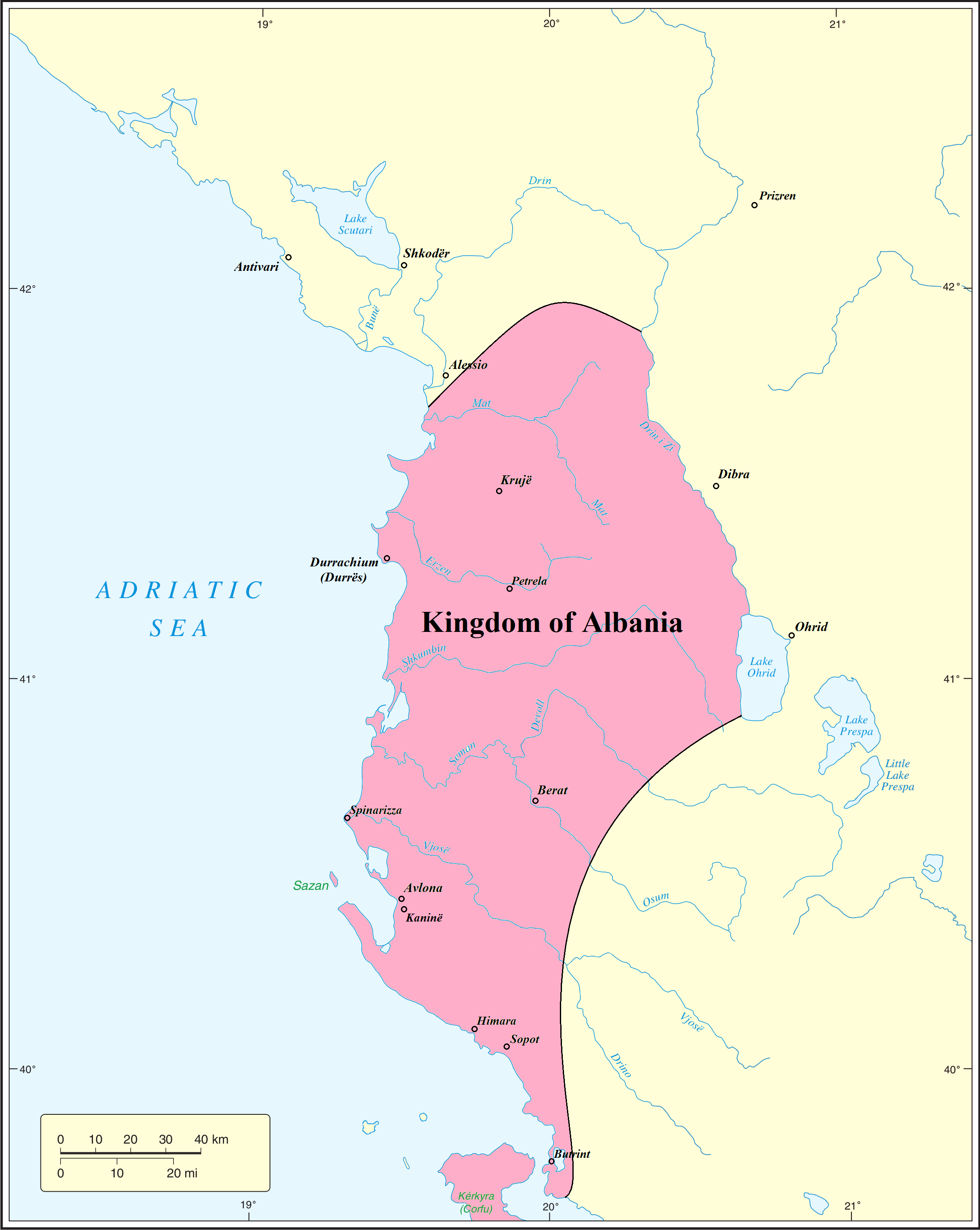
The Kingdom of Albania, around 70 years after Progoni's death, was claimed to be a successor state by Charles I of Anjou

He died in around 1215–16. His wife was soon married off to Gregory Kamonas who needed the wedding to happen in order legitimize succession of power. After he took control of Kruja, strengthening relations with Grand Principality of Serbia, which had weakened after a Slavic assault on Scutari. Komnena had a daughter with Kamonas that married Golem, who continued to rule as a semi-independent ruler in Arbanon under Theodore Komnenos Doukas of the Despotate of Epiros (until 1230) and then Ivan Asen II of Bulgaria until his death in 1241. He then oscillated between Doukas and the Nicaeans until he was finally annexed by the Nicaeans in the phase of reconstitution of the Byzantine Empire in 1252–56. The events prompted the Rebellion of Arbanon in 1257. The Principality of Arbanon is the first Albanian state that emerged in the Middle Ages. Under Progoni, it reached its maximum extent. Progoni was the first to use the terms Princeps Arbanorum and Princeps Albaniae. The legacy of a local, independent power center in Albania was used by future rulers to legitimize their power by presenting their realms as its successors. The first to do so was Charles I of Anjou with the creation of Kingdom of Albania around 70 years later. In Albanian historiography, his attempt has been assessed negatively as an "Anjou invention" which sought to turn Albania into an armed base for Angevin campaigns in contrast to the Principality of Arbanon, which was an attempt of local unification and independence from the Byzantines.

=== Succession ===
Progoni didn't have any sons. His successor was his nephew, Progon. The rule of this Progon in the Mirdita area, the many similarities between the emblem of the Progoni family in the Gëziq inscription and the coat of arms of the later Dukagjini family and the claim of the Dukagjini that they were the hereditary overlords of Ndërfandë and the abbacy of Gëziq has led historians to consider that the two clans may have been related or even that the Dukagjini were descendants of the Progoni via protosevastos Progon.

The connection of the church of Ndërfandë with the Diocese of Arbanum and consequently with the territory of Arbanon led to later disputes. The Dukagjini who held hereditary rights over the region, were in actual control of the abbacy. Gjon Kastrioti who held control of the territory of the diocese of Arbanum claimed that the abbacy should pass into his territory. The dispute was solved with mediation by the Papacy, which transferred it to the Diocese of Lezhë which had been formed in the 15th century and was de jure part of the Dukagjini lands.

Demetrio Progoni Progoni family Died: 1216
Regnal titles
Preceded by Gjin Progoni	Prince of Albania; 1208–1216	Succeeded by semi-independency

== See also ==
- List of Albanian monarchs
- Progoni family
- Progon, Lord of Kruja
- Principality of Arbanon

== Sources ==
- Anamali, Skënder; Prifti, Kristaq (2002). Historia e popullit shqiptar në katër vëllime: Shqiptarët gjatë luftës së dytë botërore dhe pas saj, 1939-1990. Botimet Toena. ISBN 978-99943-1-452-2.
- Clements, John (1992). Clements' Encyclopedia of World Governments. Vol. 10. Dallas, TX: Political Research, Incorporated.
- Ducellier, Alain (1999). "24(b) – Eastern Europe: Albania, Serbia and Bulgaria". In Abulafia, David (ed.). The New Cambridge Medieval History: Volume 5, c.1198 – c.1300. Cambridge: Cambridge University Press. pp. 779–795. ISBN 978-0-52-136289-4.
- Ducellier, Alain (1981). La façade maritime de l'Albanie au Moyen âge. Ècole des Hautes Études en Sciences Sociales. p. 48.
- Fine, John V. A. (1994). The Late Medieval Balkans: A Critical Survey from the Late Twelfth Century to the Ottoman Conquest. University of Michigan Press. ISBN 0-472-08260-4.
- Frashëri, Kristo (2008). Historia e qytetërimit shqiptar: nga kohet e lashta deri ne fund të Luftës së Dytë Botërore. Academy of Sciences of Albania. ISBN 978-9995610135.
- Haluščynskyj, Theodosius (1954). Acta Innocentii PP. 3: 1198-1216. Typis Polyglottis Vaticanis.
- Lala, Etleva (2008), Regnum Albaniae, the Papal Curia, and the Western Visions of a Borderline Nobility (PDF), Central European University, Department of Medieval Studies, p. 1
- Macrides, Ruth (2007). George Akropolites: The History: Introduction, Translation and Commentary. Oxford University Press. ISBN 978-0199210671.
- Nicol, Donald (1957). The Despotate of Epiros. Basil Blackwell.
- Norris, H. T. (1993). Islam in the Balkans: religion and society between Europe and the Arab world. University of South Carolina Press. p. 35. ISBN 978-0-87249-977-5.
- Osswald, Brendan (2007). "The Ethnic Composition of Medieval Epirus". In Ellis, Steven G.; Klusáková, Lud'a (eds.). Imagining Frontiers, Contesting Identities. Pisa: Edizioni Plus – Pisa University Press. pp. 125–154. ISBN 978-88-8492-466-7.
- Schmitt, O.; Fischer, B. J. (2022). A Concise History of Albania. Cambridge University Press. ISBN 9781009254908.
- Zamputi, Injac (1984). "Rindërtimi i mbishkrimit të Arbërit dhe mundësitë e reja për leximin e tij / La reconstruction de l'inscription de l'Arbër et les nouvelles possibilités qui s'offrent pour sa lecture". Ilira. 14 (2).
