= Rebellion of Arbanon =

Battle during the Kosovo War

Rebellion of Arbanon Kryengritja e Arbërit
Date	1257–1259
Location	Modern Central Albania
Result	Indecisive; Arbanon rebels initially defeat Nicaean forces; The revolt is put under control by 1259; Albanian nobles rebel again in 1260-1270 around Durrës

Belligerents
Principality of Arbanon	Empire of Nicaea

Commanders and leaders
Golem of Kruja	George Akropolites; John Komnenos

Casualties and losses
Unknown	Unknown

The Rebellion of Arbanon (Albanian: Kryengritja e Arbërit) in 1257–1259 was a revolt of the Principality of Arbanon (in modern central Albania) against the Empire of Nicaea and in favour of the rival Despotate of Epirus.

== History ==
Arbanon had long been an autonomous principality within Epirus, and the Nicaean conquest around 1255 was resented. The rebellion was a reaction to the imposition of Nicaean rule in the person of governor Constantine Chabaron. The rebels were active in Durrës, Ohrid, Debar and Mat. The Nicaean forces were under the command of George Akropolites, who described the events himself in his history.

In the autumn of 1257, Akropolites left Thessaloniki and by way of Kastoria entered Kounavia, Mat and Debar in an effort to convince the local chieftains to abandon the Despot of Epirus, Michael II, and submit to imperial rule. Yet, in February 1258 the Nicaean garrisons were annihilated. Taking advantage of the situation, Michael II started his campaign against the Nicaeans and captured Chabaron in Kanina. The Albanians drove back the imperial troops sent as reinforcements and Akropolites set fresh troops in the move, opening his way to Ohrid and Prespa, but without having a chance to engage the rebels in the inner regions. He was forced to return to Prilep and fell captive to Michael II. The revolt was suppressed after troops from Asia Minor were sent in the spring of 1259, headed by John Komnenos. The most decisive battle was fought in the city of Devol. After suffering heavy losses, the Byzantines were finally able to control the situation, but in the years 1260–1270 the Albanian rulers revolted again in the region of Durrës.
