= List of former capitals of Albania =

Former Capitals of Albania

This is a list of historical capitals and political centers of medieval Albanian principalities and kingdoms, Ottoman era autonomous regions, and the modern Albanian state.

== Medieval Albanian Principalities and Kingdoms (c. 1100–1500) ==
Capital	Timeline	Notes
Krujë	1190-1257	Capital of the Principality of Arbanon.
Durrës	1271–1368; 1376–1383	Capital of the Kingdom of Albania.
Berat	1279–1450	Capital of the Principality of Muzaka.
Bashtovë	1358–1367	Capital of the Principality of Mataranga.
Vlorë	1346–1417	Capital of the Principality of Vlorë.
Durrës	1359–1415	Capital of the Principality of Albania.
Arta	1359–1416	Capital of the Despotate of Arta.
Ohrid	1365–1380	Capital of the Principality of Gropa.
Ulqin & Shkodër	1371–1421	Capital of the Principality of Zeta.
Gjirokastër	1386–1418	Capital of the Principality of Gjirokastër.
Lezhë	1387–1479	Capital of the Principality of Dukagjini.
Kaninë & Sopot	13??–1462	Capital of the Principality of Arianiti.
Krujë	1389–1444	Capital of the Principality of Kastrioti.
Danjë & Shati	1396–1447	Capital of the Principality of Zaharia.
Krujë	1444–1479	Capital of the League of Lezhë.

== Ottoman Era Albanian Pashaliks (c. 1750–1831) ==
Capital	Timeline	Notes
Shkodër	1757-1831	Capital of the Pashalik of Scutari.
Berat	1774-1809	Capital of the Pashalik of Berat.
Ioannina	1787-1822	Capital of the Pashalik of Yanina.

== Modern Albanian State (1912–present) ==
Capital	Timeline	Notes
Vlorë	1912-1914	Capital of Independent Albania.
Durrës	1914-1920	Capital of the Principality of Albania.

== See also ==
- Albania
- History of Albania

== Bibliography ==
- Elsie, Robert (2003). Early Albania A Reader of Historical Texts, 11th-17th Centuries. Harrassowitz. ISBN 978-3-4470-4783-8.
- Fine, John V. A. (1994). The Late Medieval Balkans: A Critical Survey from the Late Twelfth Century to the Ottoman Conquest. University of Michigan Press. ISBN 978-0-4720-8260-5.
- Jacques, Edwin E. (2009). The Albanians: An Ethnic History from Prehistoric Times to the Present - Volume 1. McFarland & Company. ISBN 978-0-8995-0932-7.
- Schmitt, Oliver Jens; Fischer, Bernd J. (2022). A Concise History of Albania. Cambridge University Press. ISBN 978-1-1076-6218-6.
- Soulis, George Christos (1984). The Serbs and Byzantium During the Reign of Tsar Stephen Dušan (1331-1355) and His Successors. Dumbarton Oaks Library and Collection. ISBN 978-0-8840-2137-7.
- Šufflay, Milan (2012). Serbs and Albanians Their Symbiosis in the Middle Ages. GPX Alerion LLC. ISBN 978-0-9887-1292-8.
