= Michel Kaplan =

French medieval historian

- Born: 15 April 1946 (age 79); Neuilly-sur-Seine, France
- Occupations: Byzantinist, historian
- Years active: 1976–2015

Michel Kaplan (born 15 April 1946) is a French medieval historian, docteur d'État, professor emeritus and former president of Pantheon-Sorbonne University. He is a Byzantinist specialising in history of mentalities, rural space and hagiography of the Eastern Roman Empire.

== Career ==
In his early years, Kaplan followed the courses taught by Paul Lemerle. He began his career as an assistant professor and then lecturer at the Pantheon-Sorbonne University (Paris I), where he defended his thèse d'état (doctoral dissertation) Les hommes et la terre à Byzance du VI^{e} au XI^{e} siècle : propriété et exploitation du sol in 1987. He then became a professor of medieval history at Paris I since 1988 and had been president of this university from 1999 to 2004. Since 2003, his research had encompassed the history of Byzantine mentalities. He retired from his job in 2015. On 13 November 2018, a lecture given by Kaplan took place at the Athens Concert Hall in Greece.

== Honours ==
- Knight of the Legion of Honour.
- Knight of the National Order of Merit.
- Knight of the Ordre des Palmes Académiques.

== Publications ==
- Les Propriétés de la Couronne et de l'Église dans l'Empire byzantin, V^{e}-VI^{e} siècles : documents, Paris, Publications de la Sorbonne, 1976.
- Le Proche-Orient médiéval : des Barbares aux Ottomans, Paris, Hachette, 1978, nouv. éd. 1988, 1990, 1997, 2003 et 2006 (avec Alain Ducellier et Bernadette Martin).
- Tout l'or de Byzance, collection « Découvertes Gallimard » (nº 104), série Histoire. Paris: Éditions Gallimard, 1991.
- Les hommes et la terre à Byzance du VI^{e} au XI^{e} siècle : propriété et exploitation du sol, Publications de la Sorbonne, 1992.
- Les Saints et leur sanctuaire à Byzance : textes, images et monument, Paris, Publications de la Sorbonne, 1993 (avec Catherine Jolivet-Lévy et Jean-Pierre Sodini).
- La Chrétienté orientale, du début du VII^{e} siècle au milieu du XI^{e} siècle. Textes et documents, Paris, SEDES, 1996 (avec Marie-France Auzépy et Bernadette Martin-Hisard).
- La Chrétienté byzantine, du début du VIIe siècle au milieu du XI^{e} siècle : images et reliques, moines et moniales, Constantinople et Rome, Paris, SEDES, 1997.
- Le Moyen Âge, Paris, Bréal, 2000 (tome I : IV^{e}-X^{e} siècles, tome II : XI^{e}-XV^{e} siècles) (dir. Michel Kaplan, auteurs : Michel Zimmermann, Christophe Picard).
- Le Sacré et son inscription dans l'espace à Byzance et en Occident : études comparée, Paris, Publications de la Sorbonne, 2001 (direction).
- Monastères, images, pouvoirs et société à Byzance, Paris, Publications de la Sorbonne, 2006 (codirection avec Paule Pagès).
- Byzance : villes et campagnes, Paris, Picard, 2006 (recueil d'articles).
- With A. Ducellier, Byzance : IV^{e}-XV^{e} siècle, Paris, Hachette, 2006.
- Byzance, Paris, Les Belles lettres, 2007.
- Pouvoirs, Église et sainteté : essais sur la société byzantine, Paris, Publications de la Sorbonne, 2011 (recueil d'articles).
- Le Moyen Âge en Orient : Byzance et l'islam (avec A. Ducellier, B. Martin, F. Micheau), Paris, Hachette, 2012.
- Pourquoi Byzance ? : Un empire de onze siècles, Paris, Gallimard, 2016.
