= Progoni family =

Albanian noble family

Progoni
- Noble family
- Country: Medieval Albania
- Current region: Krujë, Mirditë
- Founded: 12th century
- Founder: Progon
- Members: Gjin Progoni; Demetrio Progoni
- Connected families: Dukagjini

The Progoni were an Albanian noble family which established the first Albanian state in recorded history, the Principality of Arbanon.

== History ==
Progon of Kruja, father of Dhimitër Progoni established his rule in Krujë in 1190. Before 1204, Arbanon was an autonomous principality of the Byzantine Empire. Little is known about archon Progon who ruled Krujë and its surroundings at least since the era between 1190 and 1198. The Krujë Castle and other territories remained in the Progoni, and Progon was succeeded by his sons Gjin, and later Demetrio Progoni. He used the title princeps Arbanorum ("prince of the Albanians") to refer to himself and was recognized as such by foreign dignitaries. In the correspondence with Innocent III, the territory he claimed as princeps Arbanorum was the area between Shkodra, Prizren, Ohrid and Durrës (regionis montosae inter Scodram, Dyrrachium, Achridam et Prizrenam sitae). In general, Progoni brought the principality to its climax. The area the principality controlled, ranged from the Shkumbin river valley to the Drin River valley in the north and from the Adriatic sea to the Black Drin in the east. Many later feudal rulers of Albania would lay claim to the same title and present their rule as the continuation of this state. The first to do so was Charles I of Anjou who sought to legitimize the Kingdom of Albania as a descendant state of the Principality of Arbanon about 60 years later, in 1272. After Dhimitër Progoni's death and by 1256, Arbanon would be annexed by the reemerging Byzantine Empire. He had no sons, but left as his successor his nephew Progon as protosebastos of Ndërfandë (Mirdita).

The rule of this Progon in the Mirdita area, the many similarities between the emblem of the Progoni family in the Gëziq inscription and the coat of arms of the later Dukagjini family and the claim of the Dukagjini that they were the hereditary overlords of Ndërfandë and the abbacy of Gëziq has led historians to consider that the two clans may have been related or even that the Dukagjini were descendants of the Progoni via protosebastos Progon. The village of Progonat in southern Albania may have been founded by the Progoni family due to the etymological link found between them.

== Members ==
- Progon (fl. 1190–1198), archon of Kruja
- Gjin (fl. 1198–1208), lord of Kruja
- Dhimitër (fl. 1208-1215/16), princeps Arbanorum (prince of the Albanians), megas archon, panhypersebastos
- Progon, protosebastos of Ndërfandë (Mirdita), son of Gjin
- Unnamed daughter of Gjin Progoni, married to Gregorios Kamonas, who later divorced her in order to marry Komnena Nemanjić, the widow of Dhimitër.
- Domenico, Bishop of Alessio (Lezhë) and appointed as Bishop of Arbanum on 21st November, 1369.

== See also ==
- Principality of Arbanon
- Rebellion of Arbanon
- Albanian principalities
- History of Albania
