= Alain Ducellier =

French historian

Alain Ducellier (5 May 1934 – 29 September 2018) was a French historian and professor emeritus at Université de Toulouse-Le Mirail who specialized in Byzantine studies and Christianity in the middle east. He was the author or editor of more than 40 books.

In 2004, a symposium was published in his honor: Byzance et ses périphéries : hommage à Alain Ducellier. He retired in 2003, and died on 29 September 2018 at the age of 84.

== Books ==
According to WorldCat, he was the author of:

- Ducellier, Alain. Les Byzantins. Éditions du Seuil [1963]
- Ducellier, Alain. Le miroir de l'Islam; musulmans et chrétiens d'Orient au Moyen Age (VIIe-XIe siècles), Paris, Julliard, 1971.
- Ducellier, Alain. Le drame de byzance: ideal et echec d une societe chretienne. : Hachette, 1976.
- Ducellier, Alain, Michel Kaplan, and Bernadette Martin-Hisard. Le Proche-Orient médiéval: des Barbares aux Ottomans. [Paris]: Hachette, 1978.
- Ducellier, Alain. La façade maritime de l'Albanie au Moyen Age: Durazzo et Valona du XIe au XVe siècle. Thessaloniki: Institute for Balkan Studies, 1981.
- Ducellier, Alain L'Albanie Entre Byzance Et Venise, Xe-XVe Siècles. London: Variorum reprints, 1987.
- Ducellier, Alain. Byzance et le monde orthodoxe. Paris: A. Colin, 1986.
- Ducellier, Alain. Les Byzantins: histoire et culture. Paris: Seuil, 1986.
- Ducellier, Alain. L'Église byzantine: entre pouvoir et esprit (313-1204). Paris: Desclée, 1990.
- Ducellier, Alain. Chrétiens d'Orient et Islam au Moyen âge: VIIe-XVe siècle. Paris: A. Colin, 1996.
- Ducellier, Alain, Michel Kaplan, and Michel Balard. Byzance, IVe-XVe siècle. Paris: Hachette, 1997
- Balard, Michel, and Alain Ducellier. Le partage du monde: échanges et colonisation dans la Méditerranée médiévale. Paris: Publications de la Sorbonne, 1998.
