= Gjin Progoni =

- Lord of Krujë

Lord of Krujë
- Reign: 1198–1208
- Predecessor: Progon, Lord of Kruja
- Successor: Dhimitër Progoni (as Prince of Albania)
- Died: 1208
- Issue: Progon, Protosebastos of Ndërfandë; Unnamed daughter
- House: Progoni
- Father: Progon, Lord of Kruja

Gjin Progoni (Latin: Ginius) was an archon (or lord) of Kruja, located in present-day Albania, from c. 1198 until his death in 1208. He succeeded his father, Progon of Kruja, becoming the second ruler of the Principality of Arbanon. During his reign, he controlled the areas around Elbasan and the fortress of Krujë. He also maintained good ties with the Despotate of Epirus due to the Venetian threat in northern Epirus. Gjin was succeeded by his younger brother Dhimitër Progoni.

== Issue ==
Although his spouse remains unknown, he had the following issue:

- Progon, Protosebastos of Ndërfandë who fathered Gjin Tanushi
- Unnamed daughter who married Gregorios Kamonas

== See also ==
- History of Albania
- Monarchs of Albania

Gjin Progoni Progoni family Died: 1208
Regnal titles
Preceded by Progon of Kruja	Lord of Kruja; 1198–1208	Succeeded by Dhimitër Progoni
