= Constantine Chabaron =

Constantine Chabaron (Greek: Κωνσταντῖνος Χαβάρων; fl. 1256/57–59) was an official and provincial governor for the Empire of Nicaea.

He was a confidant of Emperor Theodore II Laskaris, and was appointed by him governor of the region of Arbanon, in modern central Albania. In 1256/7 he was seduced, however, by Maria Sphrantzaina, the widowed sister-in-law of the Despot of Epirus, Michael II Komnenos Doukas. Chabaron married Maria and defected to the Epirote ruler, only to be imprisoned at Kanina. In 1259, Emperor Michael VIII Palaiologos sent Theodore Philes to achieve the release of Chabaron. Nothing further is known of him, but his wife remarried in 1266.

== Sources ==
- Trapp, Erich; Beyer, Hans-Veit; Walther, Rainer; Sturm-Schnabl, Katja; Kislinger, Ewald; Leontiadis, Ioannis; Kaplaneres, Sokrates (1976–1996). Prosopographisches Lexikon der Palaiologenzeit (in German). Vienna: Verlag der Österreichischen Akademie der Wissenschaften. ISBN 3-7001-3003-1.
