= Gregorios Kamonas =

13th-century Greek-Albanian lord

Gregorios Kamonas Grigor Kamona
- Sebastos; Lord of Krujë

Lord of Krujë
- Reign: fl. c. 1215 – ?
- Predecessor: Dhimitër Progoni (as Prince of Albania)
- Successor: Golem of Kruja
- Spouses: Daughter of Gjin Progoni; Komnena Nemanjić
- Issue: Unnamed daughter
- Religion: Eastern Orthodoxy

Gregorios Kamonas (fl. c. 1215 – ?) was a Greek-Albanian lord who ruled the Principality of Arbanon after c. 1215. Demetrios Chomatenos (1216–1236) mentioned him as having the title of sebastos, given to him by the emperor Alexios III Angelos after 1205, during his stay in the Despotate of Epirus at the court of his nephew Michael I Komnenos Doukas. He first married the daughter of Gjin Progoni, then married Serbian princess Komnena Nemanjić, the daughter of King Stefan Nemanjić and widow of Dimitri Progoni, thus inheriting the rule of Arbanon. He strengthened ties with Serbia and secured Arbanon through an Orthodox alliance. He had a daughter together with Komnena, who married Golem of Kruja, the next lord of Kruje.

== Notes ==
1. Name: Gregorios (Greek: Γρηγόριος Καμωνάς, romanized: Gri̱górios Kamo̱nás), but also Georgius, Georgios, Gregorio, Grigor (Albanian: Grigor Kamona), Grgur (Serbian: Гргур Камона) and Grigorije (Григорије Камона); his surname is also spelled Kamona.

== See also ==
- History of Albania
- Monarchs of Albania

Regnal titles
Preceded by Dimitri Progoni	Prince of Arbanon (Lord of Krujë) c. 1216	Unknown Next known title holder: Golem
