= Progon, Lord of Kruja =

12th-century first known Albanian prince

Progon
- Lord of Krujë; Archon of Arbanon
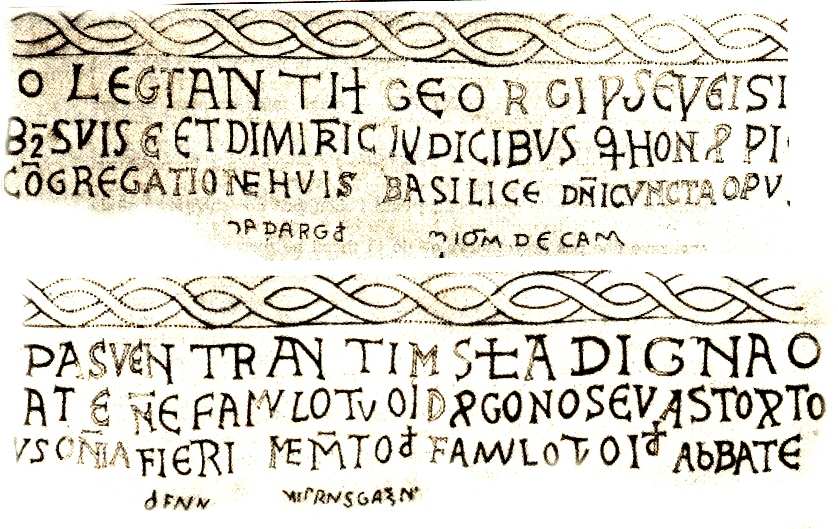
- Geziq inscription from St. Mary’s church mentioning Progon and his sons Demetrio and Gjin Progoni.

Lord of Krujë
- Reign: 1190–1198
- Successor: Gjin Progoni
- Issue: Gjin Progoni; Dhimitër Progoni
- House: Progoni

Progon was the first Albanian ruler known by name, an archon of the Kruja Fortress (modern Krujë) and its surroundings, known as the Principality of Arbanon. He ruled between 1190 and 1198. Progon was succeeded by his two sons, Gjin, and Dimitri.

== Life ==
Progon's realm was the first Albanian state during the Middle Ages. Little is known about archon Progon who was the first ruler of Kruja and its surroundings, between 1190 and 1198. The Kruja fortress stayed in the possession of the Progoni family, and Progon was succeeded by his sons Gjin, and later Dimitri. Before 1204, Arbanon was an autonomous principality of the Byzantine Empire. He is mentioned with his two sons in an inscription from the St. Mary Monastery in Trifandina, Gëziq, northern Albania. The titles archon (held by Progon) and panhypersebastos (held by Dimitri) is a sign of Byzantine dependence.

== Family ==
- Progon (founder), archon of Kruja ruled (between 1190 and 1198)
  - Gjin Progoni, ruled 1198–1208
  - Dimitri Progoni, ruled 1208–1216, married Komnena Nemanjić, the daughter of Serbian Grand Prince, later King Stefan Nemanjić (r. 1196–1228). This resulted in an alliance, and vassalage to Serbia amidst conflicts with the Republic of Venice.

== Notes ==
1. His name is rendered as Progon or Progonos (Greek: Προγονος, Progonos). He is eponymous to the Progoni family.

== Sources ==
- Kristo Frashëri (1964), The history of Albania: a brief survey. Publisher: s.n.
- John Clements (1992), Clements' encyclopedia of world governments, Volume 10, Publisher: Political Research, inc.
- Donald MacGillivray Nicol (1986), Studies in late Byzantine history and prosopography Volume 242 of Collected studies Variorum reprints; CS242 Volume 242 of Variorum reprint. Illustrated edition. Variorum Reprints, ISBN 0-86078-190-9, 9780860781905
- Donald MacGillivray Nicol (1957), The despotate of Epiros, Blackwell
- Thalóczy-Jireček-Sufflay (1913), Acta et diplomata res Albaniae mediae aetatis illustrantia: Collegerunt et digesserunt dr Ludovicus de Thalóczy, dr Constantinus Jireček et dr Emilianus de Sufflay, Volume 1, Editors: Lajos Thallóczy, Konstantin Jireček, Emil von Sufflay. Publisher: typis A. Holzhausen
- Anamali, Skënder and Prifti, Kristaq. Historia e popullit shqiptar në katër vëllime. Botimet Toena, 2002, ISBN 99927-1-622-3
- The Late Medieval Balkans: A Critical Survey from the Late Twelfth Century to the Ottoman Conquest Author John Van Antwerp Fine Edition reprint, illustrated Publisher University of Michigan Press, 1994 ISBN 0472082604, 9780472082605
- Fontes Fontes, Catholic Church. Pontificia Commissio Codici Iuris Canonici Orientalis Recognoscendo Author Catholic Church. Pontificia Commissio Codici Iuris Canonici Orientalis Recognoscendo Publisher Typis polyglottis Vaticanis, 1943
- Zogo ve Atatürk Author Tayfun Atmaca Publisher Tayfun Atmaca, 2007 ISBN 975-94215-1-8, 9789759421519
- David Abulafia, The New Cambridge Medieval History: c. 1198-c. 1300
- Elsie, Robert (2003), Early Albania : a reader of historical texts, 11th-17th centuries, ISBN 978-3-447-04783-8, OCLC 52911172
- Norris, H. T. (1993). Islam in the Balkans: religion and society between Europe and the Arab world. University of South Carolina Press. p. 35. ISBN 978-0-87249-977-5.
- Arshi Pipa, Sami Repishti, Studies on Kosova, East European Monographs, 1984
- Peter Jordan, Karl Kaser, Walter Lukan, Stephanie Schwandner-Sievers, Holm Sundhaussen, Albanien: Geographie - historische Anthropologie - Geschichte - Kultur - postkommunistische Transformation, Peter Lang, 2003
- Steven G. Ellis, Lud'a Klusáková, Imagining frontiers, contesting identities

Preceded by Post created	Lord of Kruja; 1190–1198	Succeeded by Gjin
