= Principality of Arbanon =

Medieval Albanian state

Principality of Arbanon Principata e Arbrit (Albanian)
- 1190–1215/16 (annexed c. 1256/57)
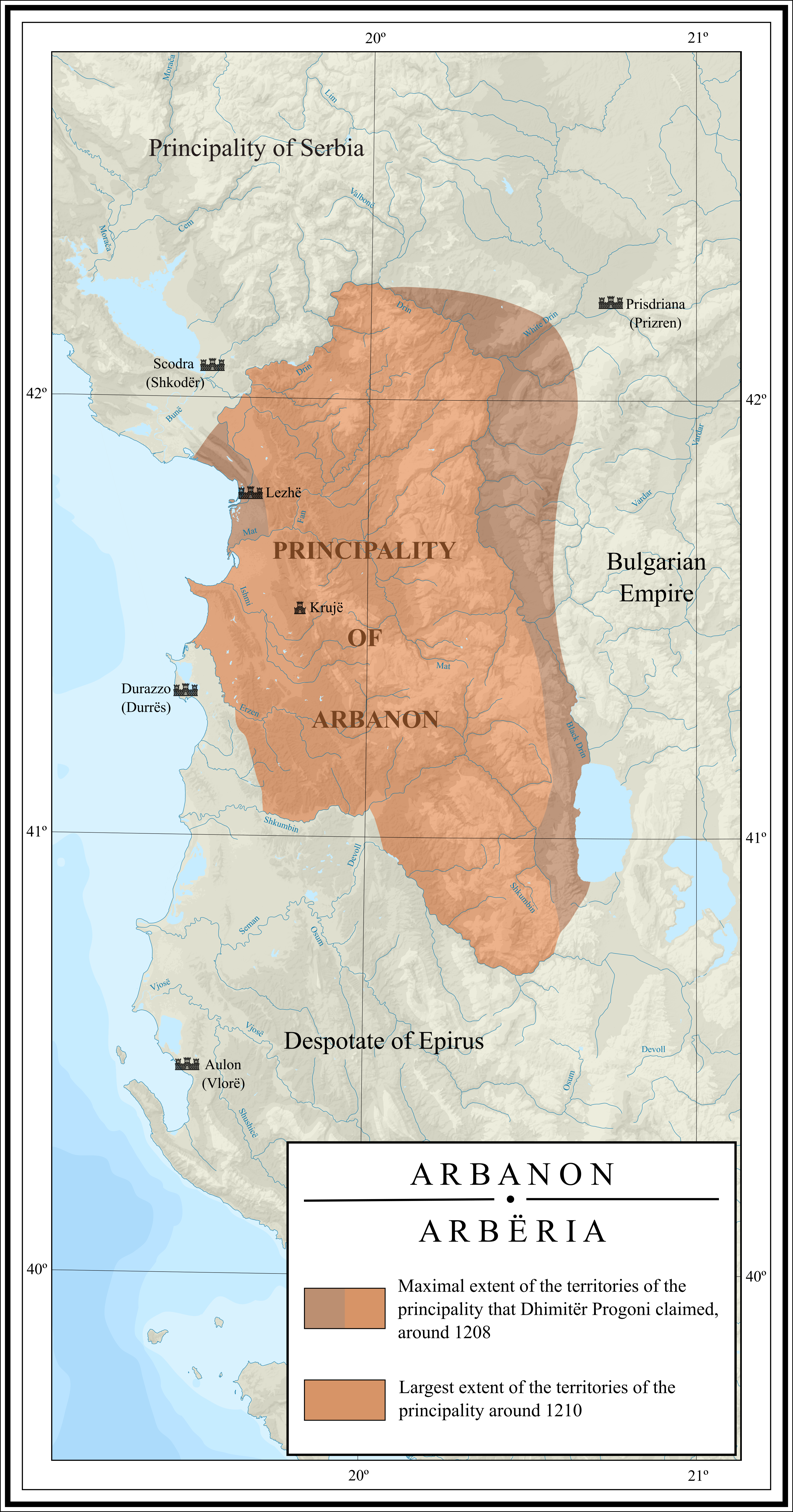
- Arbanon/Arbëria, c. 1208
- Status: Principality
- Capital: Krujë
- Common languages: Albanian
- Religion: Roman Catholicism; Eastern Orthodoxy
- Prince
  - 1190–1198: Progon (first)
  - 1198–1208: Gjin Progoni
  - 1208–1216: Dhimitër Progoni
  - 1216–1236: Grigor Kamona
  - 1252–1256: Golem (last)
- Historical era: Medieval
  - Established: 1190
  - Disestablished: 1215/16 (annexed c. 1256/57)
Preceded by	Succeeded by
Byzantine Empire under the Angelos dynasty	Kingdom of Albania
- Today part of: Albania

Arbanon (Latin: Arbanum) was a medieval principality in present-day Albania, ruled by the native Progoni family, and the first Albanian state to emerge in recorded history. The principality was established in 1190 by the Albanian archon Progon in the region surrounding Kruja, to the east and northeast of Venetian territories. Progon was succeeded by his sons Gjin and then Demetrius, who managed to retain a considerable degree of autonomy from the Byzantine Empire. In 1204, Arbanon attained full, though temporary, political independence, taking advantage of the weakening of Constantinople following its pillage during the Fourth Crusade. However, Arbanon lost its large autonomy c. 1216, when the ruler of Epirus, Michael I Komnenos Doukas, started an invasion northward into Albania and Macedonia, taking Kruja and ending the independence of the principality. From this year, after the death of Demetrius, the last ruler of the Progoni family, Arbanon was successively controlled by the Despotate of Epirus, then by the Bulgarian Empire and, from 1235, by the Empire of Nicaea.

During this period, the area was ruled by the Greco-Albanian lord Gregorios Kamonas, the new spouse of Demetrius' Serbian former wife Komnena Nemanjić, and by Golem (Gulam), a local magnate who had married Kamonas' and Komnena's daughter. Arbanon was eventually annexed in the winter of 1256–57 by the Byzantine statesman George Akropolites. Golem subsequently disappeared from historical records. Akropolites' historical writings are the main primary source for late Arbanon and its history. In 1272 most of the territory of Arbanon, together with Durrës, became part of the Kingdom of Albania.

== Etymology ==
The principality was known as Árvanon (Ἄρβανον) in Greek, as Arbanum in Latin, and as Raban in the early 13th-century Serbian document Life of Stefan Nemanja.

The term represents the name of a south Illyrian tribe attested in Ancient Greek as Ἀλβανοί (Albanoi), later on denoting a proper name for an ethnic Albanian until it was replaced with Shqiptar in the 18th century. It is attributed directly to a Latin rendering of the tribal name Albanoi by Orel.

Versions of "Arbën" have been observed since the 2nd century BC, the History of the World written by Polybius, mentions a location named Arbona (ancient Greek Ἄρβωνα, Latin Arbo) in which some Illyrian troops, under Queen Teuta, scattered and fled to in order to escape the Romans. Arbona was perhaps an island in Liburnia or another location within Illyria.

In the 6th century AD, Stephanus of Byzantium, in his important geographical dictionary entitled Ethnica (Ἐθνικά), mentions a city in Illyria called Arbon (Ἀρβών), and gives an ethnic name for its inhabitants, in two singular number forms, i.e. Arbonios (Ἀρβώνιος) and Arbonites (Ἀρβωνίτης), pl. Ἀρβωνῖται. He cites Polybius (as he does many other times Polybius' own attitude to Rome has been variously interpreted, pro-Roman, ... frequently cited in reference works such as Stephanus' Ethnica and the Suda. in Ethnica).

== Status ==
Many scholars note that the Principality of Arbanon was the first Albanian state to emerge during the Middle Ages. Arbanon is generally considered to have retained large autonomy until Demetrius death in 1216, when the principality fell under the vassalage of Epirus or the Laskarids of Nicaea.

Between 1190 and 1204, Arbanon was a principality of the Byzantine Empire and possessed a considerable degree of autonomy, although the titles 'archon' (held by Progon) and 'panhypersebastos' (held by Dhimitër) are evident signs of Byzantine dependence. In the context of a weakening of Byzantine power in the region following the sack of Constantinople in 1204, Arbanon attained full autonomy for 12 years until the death of Demetrios in 1215 or 1216.

The Gëziq inscription mentions the Progoni family as judices, and notes their dependence on Vladin and Đorđe Nemanjić (r. 1208–1216), the princes of Zeta. In its last phase, Arbanon was mainly connected to the Despotate of Epirus and also maintained allied relation with the Kingdom of Serbia. In 1252, Golem submitted to the Empire of Nicaea.

== Geography ==
In the 11th century AD, the name Arbanon (also Albanon) was applied to a region in the mountainous area to the west of Ohrid Lake and the upper valley of the river Shkumbin. In 1198, a part of the area north of the Drin was briefly controlled by Stefan Nemanjić who recounts that in that year he captured Pult from Arbanon (ot Rabna). In 1208, in the correspondence with Pope Innocent III, the territory that Demetrius Progoni claimed as princeps Arbanorum was the area between Shkodra, Prizren, Ohrid and Durrës (regionis montosae inter Scodram, Dyrrachium, Achridam et Prizrenam sitae). In general, Progoni brought the principality to its climax. The area the principality controlled at this time, ranged from the Shkumbin river valley to the Drin river valley in the north and from the Adriatic sea to the Black Drin in the east. George Akropolites, who wrote in detail about the area in its last phase positioned its then territory between Durrës and Lake Ohrid in a west to east axis and between the Shkumbin river valley and Mat river valley in a south to north axis. The fortress of Krujë was the military and administrative center of the region throughout its existence.

== History ==
=== Early development ===
There are scarce sources about Arbanon, with the exception of the chronicles of Byzantine historian George Akropolites, whose work is the most detailed primary source for Arbanon and this period of Albanian history in general. In 1166, we know that prior Arbanensis Andrea and episcopis Arbanensis Lazarus participated in a ceremony held in Kotor, then under the Serbian Grand Principality. A year later in 1167, Pope Alexander III, in a letter directed to Lazarus, congratulates him for returning his bishopric to Catholic faith and invites him to acknowledge the archbishop of Ragusa as his superior. After some resistance from local officials, the bishopric of Arbanon was put under the direct dependence of the Pope, as documented in a Papal letter dated in 1188.

Little is known about archon Progon who was, between 1190 and 1198, the first ruler of Kruja and its surroundings. The Kruja fortress stayed in the possession of the Progoni family, and Progon was succeeded by his son Gjin, who died in 1208 (or 1207), and later by his other son Demetrius (Dhimitër).

=== Reign of Demetrius Progoni ===
Demetrius was the third and last lord of the Progoni family, ruling between 1208 (or 1207) and 1216 (or 1215). He succeeded his brother Gjin and brought the principality to its climax. Since the beginning of his rule, Dhimitër Progoni sought out to create friendly networks in foreign policy in order to preserve the sovereignty of Arbanon against external threats, the most important of whom were for much of his reign the Republic of Venice and later the Despotate of Epirus. In 1208–09, he considered conversion to Catholicism from Eastern Orthodoxy for the first time in order to obtain support against his Venetian rivals. As Venice had been given the nominal rights to control Albania, conversion to Catholicism would nullify Venetian claims over territory controlled by another Catholic state, the Principality of Arbanon. It would also protect him from expansion by post-Byzantine successor states like the Despotate of Epirus. In his preserved correspondence with Pope Innocent III, Progoni as leader of the iudices of Arbanon, who signed as his followers, asked the Pope to send missionaries to spread Catholicism in his land. The Pope responded that Nicolaus, the Catholic archdeacon of Durrës had been instructed to make preparations for the mission. Shortly after, however, Demetrio stopped the process because he didn't consider it important any longer. He had defeated Đorđe Nemanjić, a Venetian vassal whom he bordered to the north and thus felt less threatened by Venice.

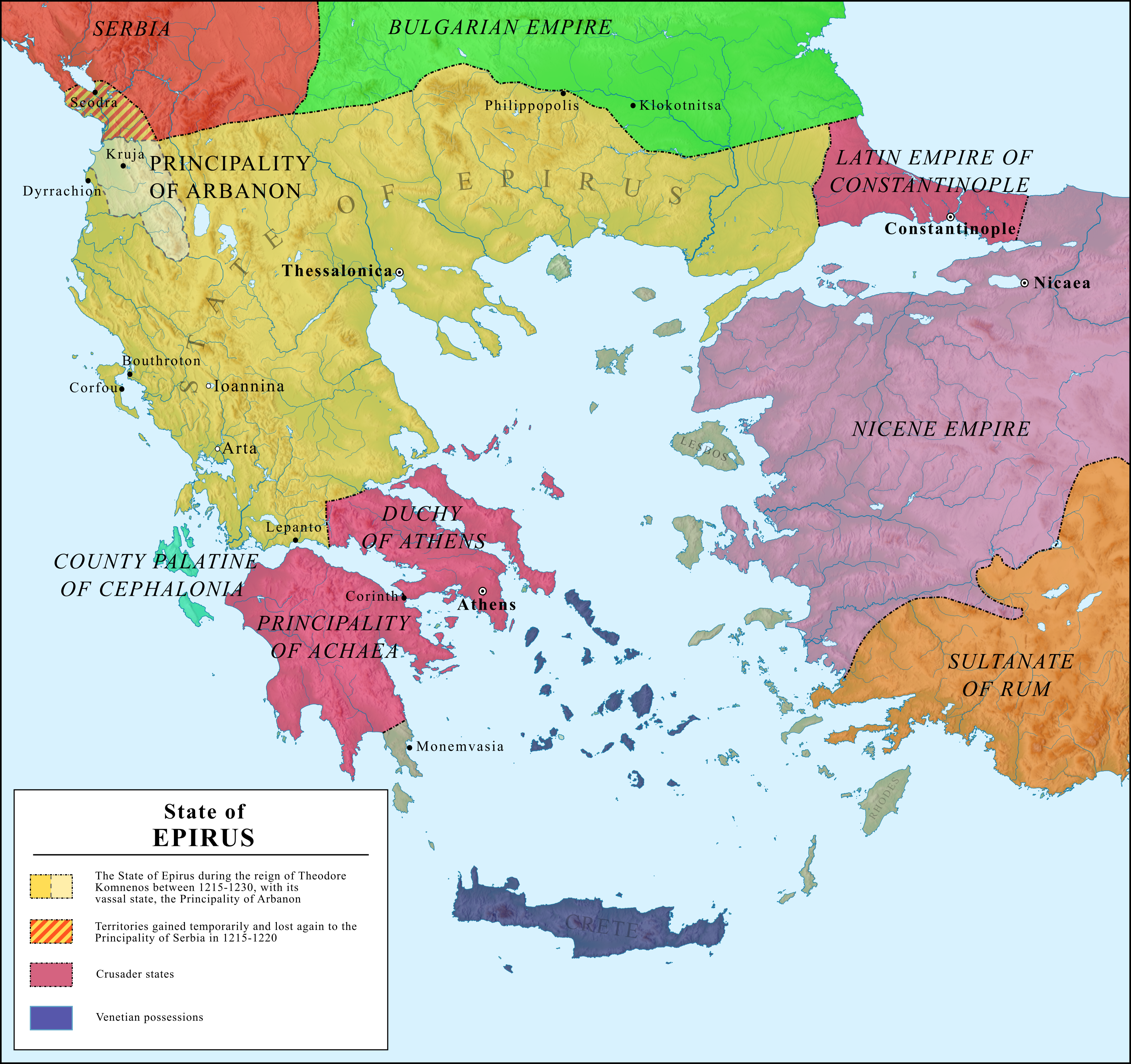
Arbanon between 1215 and 1230

Nemanjić had previously promised military support to Venice if Progoni attacked Venetian territory, in a treaty signed on 3 July 1208. In 1208, he also had secured a marriage with Komnena Nemanjić, who was both the daughter of Stefan Nemanjić, rival of Đorđe Nemanjić and granddaughter of the last Byzantine Emperor Alexios III Angelos. In this context, because of the relation of his consort to the Byzantine imperial family, Demetrius was recognized by the title of panhypersebastos. After the death of the Catholic archbishop of Durrës, the Venetians and Progoni - each in their respective territories - seized church property. For his actions against church property, he was excommunicated. He used the title princeps Arbanorum ("prince of the Albanians") to refer to himself and was recognized as such by foreign dignitaries. In the correspondence with Innocent III, the territory he claimed as princeps Arbanorum was the area between Shkodra, Prizren, Ohrid and Durrës (regionis montosae inter Scodram, Dyrrachium, Achridam et Prizrenam sitae). In general, Progoni brought the principality to its climax. The area the principality controlled, ranged from the Shkumbin river valley to the Drin river valley in the north and from the Adriatic sea to the Black Drin in the east. In Latin documents, Demetrius is also referred to as iudex. In Byzantine records, he is titled as megas archon and after the consolidation of his rule as panhypersebastos.

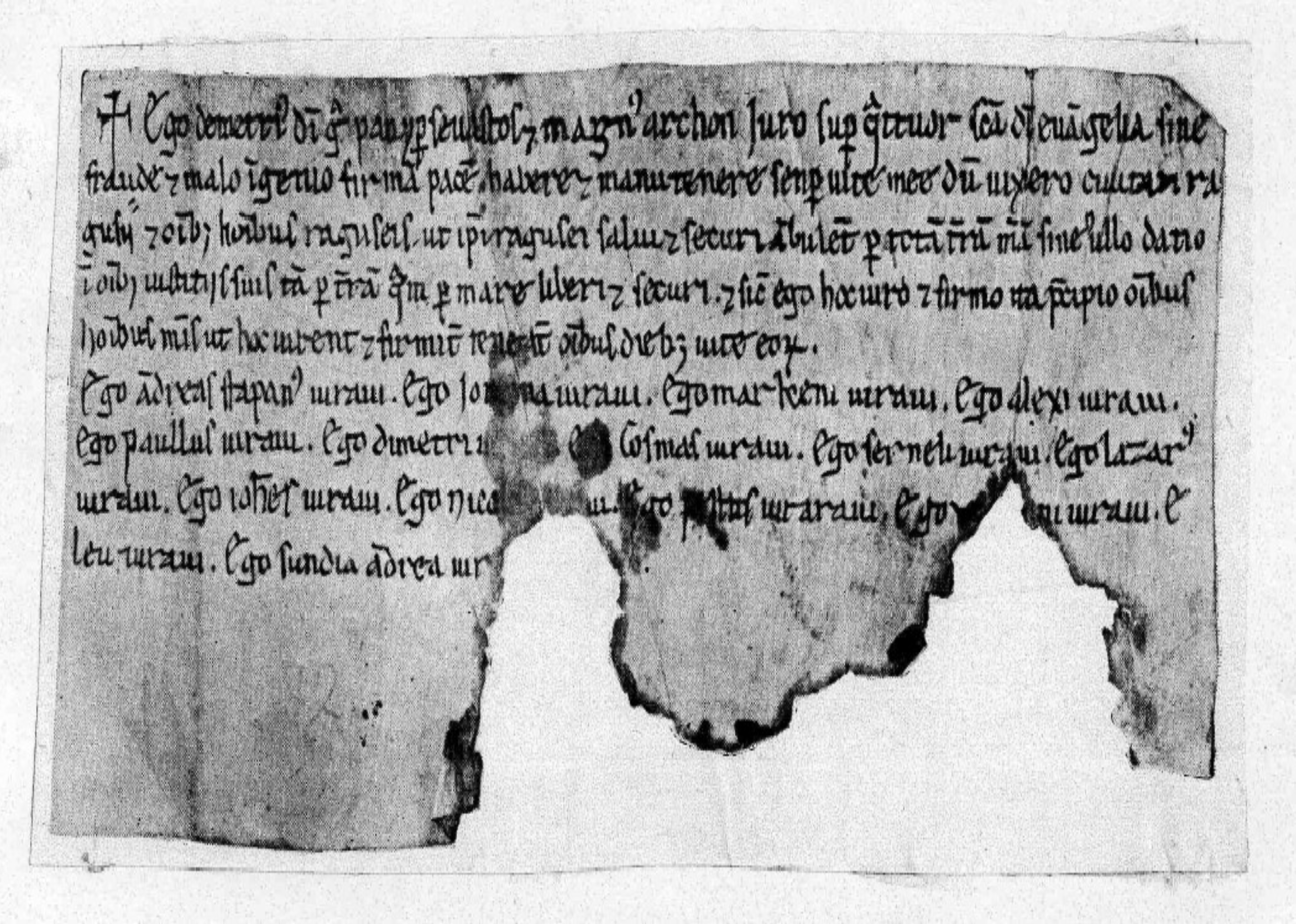
Reproduction of the 1210 Commercial Agreement between Dhimitër Progoni of Arbanon and the Republic of Ragusa.

In 1209, in search for allies, he also signed a treaty with the Republic of Ragusa which allowed for free passage of Ragusan merchants in Albanian territory. The following year, an agreement was concluded between the Republic of Venice and Michael I Komnenos Doukas of the Despotate of Epirus under which Doukas would become a vassal of Venice, if the republic recognized his claims up to the Shkumbin river valley, a core area of Arbanon. In 1212, Venice also allowed for the possession of the coastal duchy of Durrës to pass to Michael and abandoned its direct control of central Albania. The agreement had dire consequences for the principality, which surrounded by hostile forces, seems to have been reduced by the end of the life of Dhimitër Progoni to the area north of Shkumbin and south of Drin. Evidence for this period has been provided by the foundational inscription of the Catholic church of Gëziq in the Ndërfandë near modern Rreshen in Mirdita. The inscription is written in Latin and has been produced after Progoni's death. The inscription shows that Progoni, who had been reaccepted in the Catholic Church, had provided funds for the building of the church, which he might have planned to become the seat of the Diocese of Arbanum or a new diocese in the centre of his remaining domain. This is indicated by the fact that the new church was built on the site of an older church dedicated to St. Mary (Shën Mëri) but Progoni dedicated the new church to Shën Premte, the patron saint of Arbanum. He had maintained the semi-independence of this area under an agreement in which he accepted the high suzerainty of Zeta and the rulers of Zeta didn't get involved in internal affairs of the region in return. In the inscription which also serves as the last will of Progoni, the church is dedicated to his people (nationi obtulit) and his successor is designated, Progon - son of Gjin Progoni - as protosebastos.

=== Reign of Gregory Kamonas and Golem ===
After the death of Demetrius in 1215 or 1216, the power was left to his wife Komnena. She was soon married off to Gregory Kamonas, who himself had earlier been married to Gjin's daughter and needed the wedding to happen to legitimize the succession of power. After he took control of Kruja, he strengthened relations with the Grand Principality of Serbia, which had weakened after a Slavic assault on Scutari.

Demetrius had no son to succeed him. Komnena had a daughter with Kamonas, who married a local magnate named Golem (Gulam). The latter continued to rule as a semi-independent ruler in Arbanon under Theodore Komnenos Doukas of the Despotate of Epirus (until 1230) and then Ivan Asen II of Bulgaria until his death in 1241. He then oscillated between Doukas and the Nicaeans until he was finally annexed by the Nicaeans in the phase of reconstitution of the Byzantine Empire in 1252–1256. During the conflicts between Michael II Komnenos Doukas of Epirus and the Emperor of Nicaea John III Doukas Vatatzes, Golem and Theodore Petraliphas, who were initially Michael's allies, eventually defected to John III in 1252. However, the initial Nicaean conquest where the Emperor Theodore II Laskaris appointed Constantine Chabaron as the ruler of the Principality, proved short-lived, for the events prompted the Rebellion of Arbanon in 1257. Golem is last mentioned in the historical records among other 'notables' of Arbanon, in a meeting with George Akropolites in Durrës that occurred in the winter of 1256–1257. Akropolites subsequently annexed the statelet and installed a Byzantine civil, military and fiscal administration. In 1256 Manfred of Sicily invades Durrës and the surrounding area down to Berat and Vlorë. After his death they passed to Charles I of Anjou. In late february of 1272 the Kingdom of Albania was declared, with Durrës as its main seat.

== Possessions ==
Arbanon extended over the modern districts of central Albania, with the capital at Kruja.

It was a small territory in the 11th and 12th centuries, stretching from rivers Devoll to Shkumbin. According to Alain Ducellier, Arbanon did not have direct access to the sea. Robert Elsie notes that the coastal cities of modern Albania did not have noticeable Albanian communities throughout the Middle Ages, whereas the coasts of Epirus further south, despite their control by Serbs and Greeks, were primarily inhabited by Albanians according to Ducellier.

The fortresses of Kruja was the seat of the state. Progon gained possession of the surroundings of the fortress which became hereditary.

== Economy ==
Arbanon was a beneficiary of the Via Egnatia trade road, which brought wealth and benefits from the more economically developed Byzantine civilization.

== Monarchs ==
Picture	^{Title}Name	Reign	Notes
	^{Lord of Krujë} Progoni	1190–1198	Progon was the first known Albanian ruler of the first ever known Albanian State.
	^{Lord of Krujë} Gjin Progoni	1198–1208	Eldest son of Progoni.
	^{Princeps Albaniae} Dhimitër Progoni	1208–1216	Youngest son of Progoni. He secured further independence for Arbanon and extended the Principality to its maximum height.
	^{Lord of Krujë} Gregorios Kamonas	1216–12??	A Greek-Albanian Lord, he first married the daughter of Gjin Progoni, then married Komnena Nemanjić who was the Widow of Dhimitër Progoni allowing him to inherit the rule of the Principality Arbanon.
	^{Lord of Krujë} Golem of Kruja	12??–1257	The last ruler of the principality of Arbanon. He rose to power through his marriage to the daughter of Gregorios Kamonas. The ascension of Golem was regarded as a reversion to the native rule of Albania.

== See also ==
- Kingdom of Albania (medieval)
- Progoni family
- Rebellion of Arbanon
- Albanian principalities
- History of Albania

== Bibliography ==
- Anamali, Skënder; Prifti, Kristaq (2002). Historia e popullit shqiptar në katër vëllime (in Albanian). Botimet Toena. ISBN 978-99927-1-622-9.
- Clements, John (1992). Clements' Encyclopedia of World Governments. Vol. 10. Dallas, TX: Political Research, Incorporated.
- Ducellier, Alain (1981). La façade maritime de l'Albanie au Moyen âge. École des Hautes Études en Sciences Sociales.
- Ducellier, Alain (1999). "Albania, Serbia and Bulgaria". In Abulafia, David (ed.). The New Cambridge Medieval History, Volume 5, c.1198–c.1300. Cambridge: Cambridge University Press. pp. 779–795. ISBN 978-1-13905573-4.
- Ellis, Steven G.; Klusáková, Lud'a (2007). Imagining Frontiers, Contesting Identities. Edizioni Plus. pp. 134–. ISBN 978-88-8492-466-7.
- Elsie, Robert (2003). Early Albania : a reader of historical texts, 11th-17th centuries. ISBN 978-3-44704783-8. OCLC 52911172.
- Elsie, Robert (2010). Historical Dictionary of Albania. Scarecrow Press. ISBN 978-0-8108-7380-3.
- Fine, John V. A. (1994) [1987]. The Late Medieval Balkans: A Critical Survey from the Late Twelfth Century to the Ottoman Conquest. Ann Arbor, Michigan: University of Michigan Press. ISBN 978-0-472-10079-8.
- Frashëri, Kristo (1964). The history of Albania: a brief survey. Tirana. OCLC 230172517.
- Frashëri, Kristo (2008). Historia e qytetërimit shqiptar: nga kohet e lashta deri ne fund të Luftës së Dytë Botërore. Academy of Sciences of Albania. ISBN 978-9995610135.
- Haluščynskyj, Theodosius (1954). Acta Innocentii PP. 3: 1198-1216. Typis Polyglottis Vaticanis.
- Koçi, Dorian; Bushi, Skënder; Llukani, Andrea (2018). "Thesare nga pavijoni i mesjetës dhe këndi i pashallëqeve të mëdha shqiptare" [Treasuries from the medieval pavilion and the great Albanian pashaliks' corner]. In Shehu, Hajri (ed.). Thesare të Muzeut Historik Kombëtar [Treasuries of National Historical Museum] (in English and Albanian). Translated by Elda Bylyku. Tiranë: Muzeu Historik Kombëtar [National Historical Museum]. pp. 42–80.
- Lala, Etleva (2008), Regnum Albaniae, the Papal Curia, and the Western Visions of a Borderline Nobility (PDF), Central European University, Department of Medieval Studies, p. 1
- Macrides, Ruth (2007). George Akropolites: The History: Introduction, Translation and Commentary. Oxford University Press. ISBN 978-0199210671.
- Nicol, Donald McGillivray (1957). The Despotate of Epiros. Oxford: Blackwell & Mott, Limited.
- Nicol, Donald MacGillivray (1986). Studies in Late Byzantine History and Prosopography. London: Variorum Reprints. ISBN 978-0-86078-190-5.
- Trapp, Erich; Beyer, Hans-Veit; Walther, Rainer; Sturm-Schnabl, Katja; Kislinger, Ewald; Leontiadis, Ioannis; Kaplaneres, Sokrates (1976–1996). Prosopographisches Lexikon der Palaiologenzeit (in German). Vienna: Verlag der Österreichischen Akademie der Wissenschaften. ISBN 3-7001-3003-1.
- Varzos, Konstantinos (1984). Η Γενεαλογία των Κομνηνών [The Genealogy of the Komnenoi]. Centre for Byzantine Studies, University of Thessaloniki.
- Winnifrith, Tom (1992). Perspectives On Albania. Springer. ISBN 978-1-349-22050-2.
- Zamputi, Injac (1984). "Rindërtimi i mbishkrimit të Arbërit dhe mundësitë e reja për leximin e tij / La reconstruction de l'inscription de l'Arbër et les nouvelles possibilités qui s'offrent pour sa lecture". Ilira. 14 (2).
