= Golem of Kruja =

13th-century Albanian nobleman

- Lord of Krujë

Lord of Krujë
- Reign: 12??–1257
- Predecessor: Grigor Kamona
- Spouse: Daughter of Grigor Kamona

Golem was an Albanian nobleman who ruled the Principality of Arbanon, in its phase of semi-independency. He was the last ruler of Arbanon before its final annexation in the reemerging Byzantine Empire. His holdings included Krujë and probably Ohrid.

== Rule ==
He rose to rule Arbanon through marriage with the daughter of sebastos Gregorios Kamonas and Komnena Nemanjić and then succeeded him to rule Arbanon. The ascension of Golem is regarded as a reversion to the native rule of Albania. Komnena was the daughter of Stefan the First-Crowned and grand-daughter of Alexios III Angelos, the last Byzantine Emperor before the Fourth Crusade. This particular aspect of her origin would become important in later political developments as she was the niece of Irene Laskarina, Empress of Nicaea and thus related to the Nicaean Emperor John III Doukas Vatatzes.

The exact date of Golem's rise to power is unknown. In his time, Arbanon had moved from independence under Dhimitër Progoni to semi-independence under the high suzerainty of Theodore Komnenos Doukas of the Despotate of Epirus until 1230 when Ivan Asen II of Bulgaria expanded westwards. When he died in 1240, the Despotate of Epirus under the Komneno-Doukai exerted again its influence in central Albania. This was the era of the rise of the Nicaean Empire which sought to take hold of all post-Byzantine states and reform the Byzantine Empire. In this context, the struggle between Michael II Komnenos Doukas and John III Doukas Vatatzes developed. In 1246, the two expanded in the region of Macedonia and the new border between them in the area between Albania and western Macedonia. Golem was in control of Ohrid at the time. He, Theodore Petraliphas and others who were allies of Michael Doukas negotiated with Vatatzes and changed sides. Golem was probably in control of Ohrid and Petraliphas of Kastoria. Both men were in the region of Kastoria with their armies in order to support Michael against Vatatzes but instead of preparing to fight against him, they reached an agreement with Vatatzes who had also camped in western Macedonia. The exact details of the agreement are not known but contemporary historian George Pachymeres writes that Golem (Goulielmos) was "honored with Roman dignities" by the Nicaean Emperor. Golem is last mentioned in the historical records among other 'notables' of Arbanon, in a meeting with George Akropolites in Durrës that occurred in the winter of 1256–1257. Akropolites subsequently annexed the statelet and installed a Byzantine civil, military and fiscal administration.

== In historiography ==
Golem of Kruja is mentioned in two contemporary accounts. As Goulamos in that of George Akropolites and as Goulielmos in that of George Pachymeres. Thus, his name could either be a variant of William, which had entered Albanian as Gulielm or Golem, which had entered Albanian either via Latin Gulielmus or south Slavic/Bulgarian and signified one's high status. In Albanian historiography, those scholars who have favored the second hypothesis have proposed a possible connection to the Arianiti family, some members of which also used Golem in their names (Moisi Golemi).

== Notes ==
- According to Donald M. Nicol, Golem was the "chieftain of Krujë and Elbasan". Other modern sources also call him "Prince of Krujë and Elbasan", "Prince of Arbanon", or "Territorial lord of Albanon".

Preceded by Gregorios Kamonas	Lord of Kruja and Elbasan fl. 1252–1254	Succeeded by Post abolished
