= Arbanum =

Arbanum is a town, former bishopric and present titular see in present Albania.

== Latin bishopric ==
Arbanum was established circa 1100 as Diocese of Arbano (or Albania), suffragan of the Metropolitan Archbishopric of Durrës (Italian Durazzo).

It was suppressed in 1640, its territory being merged into that of its Metropolitan, the Archdiocese of Durrës (Durazzo), to which its last incumbent was appointed.

=== Episcopal Ordinaries ===
(all Roman Rite)

Suffragan Bishops of Arbano

(incomplete : first centuries unavailable)

- Giacomo (1357.01.07 – ?)
- Dionigi (? – ?)
- Domenico Progoni (1369.11.21 – ?)
- Andrea (? – death 1370?)
- Giovanni Lourlis, Dominican Order (O.P.) (1370.06.28 – ?)
- Gregorio da Venezia, Conventual? Franciscans (O.F.M.) (1385? – ?)
- Pietro (? – ?)
- Giovanni da Trieste, O.F.M. (1391.03.01 – ?)
- Francesco Petri, Cistercians (O. Cist.) (1394.09.07 – ?)
- Andrea de Rhegino, O.P. (? – death 1397.10.06)
- Tommaso Butyller (? – 1401.05.16), later Bishop of Ugento (Italy) (1401.05.16 – death 1405)
- Giorgio, Benedictine Order (O.S.B.) (1402.01.30 – ?)
- Vulcano Suinti, O.S.B. (1412.03.28 – ?)
- Andrea Sume (1426.05.10 – ?), previously Bishop of Lezhë (Albania) (1405.10.05 – 1426.05.10)
- Andrea de Suincis (1441.06.12 – ?)
- Nicola (1463.10.05 – ?)
- Angelo da Macerata (1494.10.01 – death 1506)
- Giovanni Corona, O.P. (1506.06.24 – death 1515)
- Giovanni Montalbo (1518.03.03 – ?)
- Ludovico Vivaldi, O.P. (1519.09.19 – ?)
- Pedro de Torres (1540.08.27 – ?)
- Domenico Bigorrei (1554.11.19 – ?)
- Giovanni Collesius, O.F.M. (1615.08.31 – death 1625), also Coadjutor Bishop of Duvno (Bosnia and Herzegovina) (1615.08.31 – 1625)
- Marcus Scura, O.F.M. (1635.10.01 – 1640.09.10), later Archbishop of Durrës (Durazzo, Albania) (1640.09.10 – death 1656.04.27)

== Titular see ==
The diocese was nominally restored in 1933 as Titular bishopric of Arbanum (Curiate Italian Arbano).

It has had the following incumbents, of the lowest (episcopal) rank :

- Titular Bishop Giuseppe Perniciaro (1937.10.26 – 1967.07.12)
- Titular Bishop Jules-Louis-Paul Harlé (1970.10.12 – 1999.01.24)
- Titular Bishop Erminio De Scalzi (1999.05.11 – ...), Auxiliary Bishop of Milan(o) (Italy)

== See also ==
- List of Catholic dioceses in Albania
- Roman Catholic Suburbicarian Diocese of Albano, near Rome

== Sources and external links ==
- GCatholic with incumbent bio links
