= Albania in the Middle Ages =

12th–15th century history of Albania

Albania in the Middle Ages was a period during the European Middle Ages when the Roman Empire divided into east and west in 395, the territories of modern Albania became a part of the Byzantine Empire. At the end of the 12th century, the Principality of Arbanon was formed which lasted until mid-13th century, after its dissolution it was followed with the creation of the Albanian Kingdom after an alliance between the Albanian noblemen and Angevin dynasty. After a war against the Byzantine Empire led the kingdom occasionally decrease in size until the Angevins eventually lost their rule in Albania and led the territory ruled by several different Albanian chieftains until the mid-14th century which for a short period of time were conquered by the short-lived empire of Serbia. After its fall in 1355 several chieftains regained their rule and significantly expanded until the arrival of the Ottomans after the Battle of Savra.

After the Battle of Savra in 1385 most of local chieftains became Ottoman vassals. In 1415–1417 most of the central and southern Albania was incorporated into the Ottoman Empire and its newly established Sanjak of Albania. In 1432-36 local Albanian chieftains dissatisfied with losing their pre-Ottoman privileges organized a revolt in southern Albania. The revolt was suppressed until another revolt was organized by Skanderbeg in 1443, after the Ottoman defeat in the Battle of Niš, during the Crusade of Varna. In 1444, Gjergj Kastrioti Skanderbeg was proclaimed as the leader of the regional Albanian chieftains and nobles united against the Ottoman Empire in the League of Lezhë disestablished in 1479. Skanderbeg's rebellion against the Ottoman Empire lasted for 25 years. Despite his military valor he was not able to do more than to hold his own possessions within the very small area in the North Albania where almost all his victories against the Ottomans took place. By 1479 the Ottomans captured all Venetian possessions, except Durazzo which they captured in 1501. Until 1913 the territory of Albania would remain part of the Ottoman Empire.

== Komani-Kruja culture ==
The Komani-Kruja culture is an archaeological culture attested from late antiquity to the Middle Ages in central and northern Albania, southern Montenegro and similar sites in the western parts of North Macedonia. It consists of settlements usually built below hillforts along the Lezhë (Praevalitana)-Dardania and Via Egnatia road networks which connected the Adriatic coastline with the central Balkan Roman provinces. Its type site is Komani and its fort on the nearby Dalmace hill in the Drin river valley. Kruja and Lezha represent significant sites of the culture. The population of Komani-Kruja represents a local, western Balkan people which was linked to the Roman Justinianic military system of forts. The development of Komani-Kruja is significant for the study of the transition between the classical antiquity population of Albania to the medieval Albanians who were attested in historical records in the 11th century.

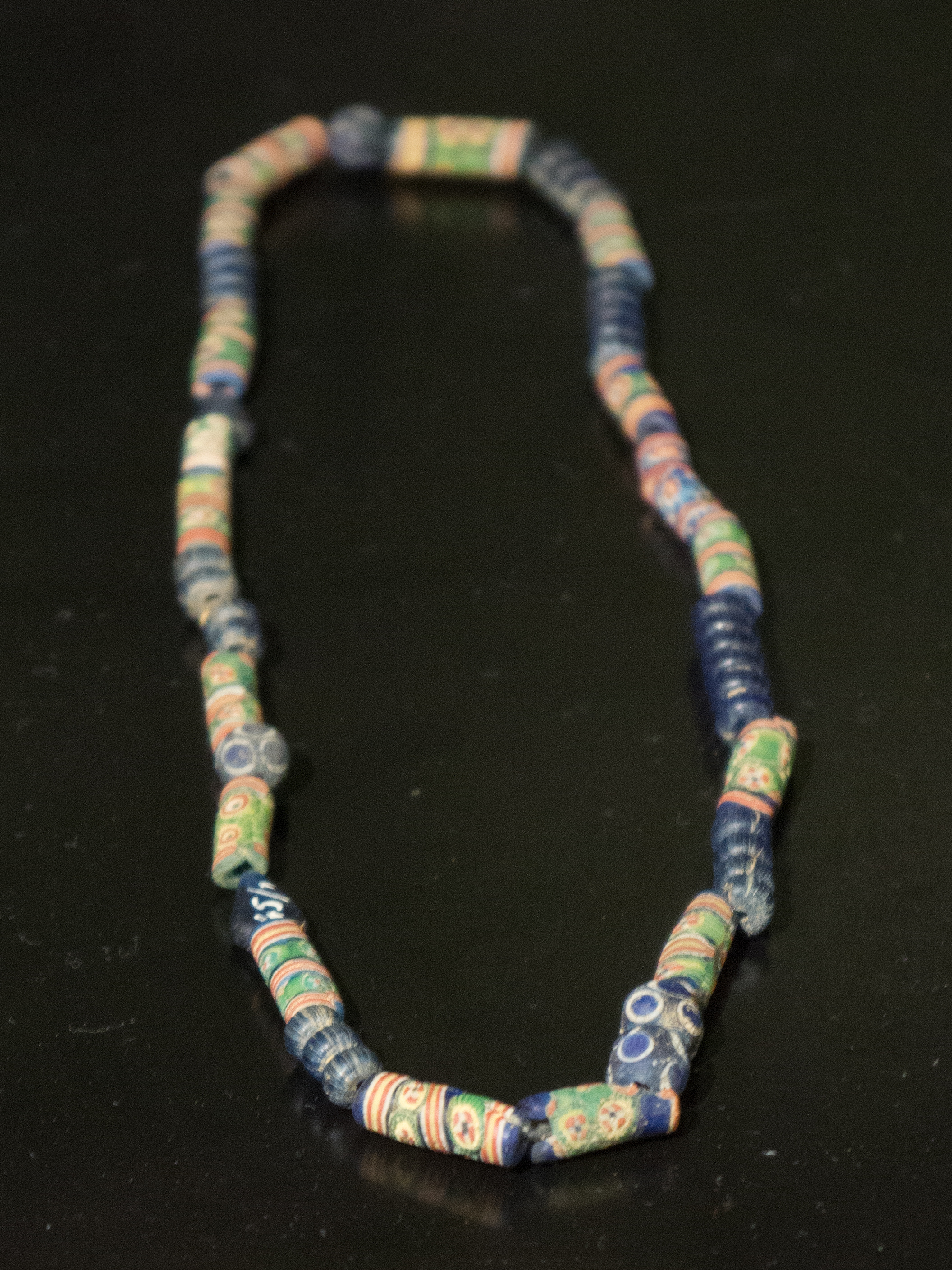
Glass necklace from the Komani-Kruja culture from the 7th-8th century

Research greatly expanded after 2009 and the first survey of Komani's topography was produced in 2014. Until then, except for the area of the cemetery the size of the settlement and its extension remained unknown. In 2014, it was revealed that Komani occupied an area of more than 40 ha, a much larger territory than originally thought. Its oldest settlement phase dates to the Hellenistic era. Proper development began in the late antiquity and continued well into the Middle Ages (13th-14th centuries). It indicates that Komani was a late Roman fort and an important trading node in the networks of Praevalitana and Dardania. Participation in trade networks of the eastern Mediterranean via sea routes seems to have been very limited even in nearby coastal territory in this era. In the Avar-Slavic raids, communities from present-day northern Albania and nearby areas clustered around hill sites for better protection as is the case of other areas like Lezha and Sarda. During the 7th century as Byzantine authority was reestablished after the Avar-Slavic raids and the prosperity of the settlements increased, Komani saw increase in population and a new elite began to take shape. Increase in population and wealth was marked by the establishment of new settlements and new churches in their vicinity. Komani formed a local network with Lezha and Kruja and in turn this network was integrated in the wider Byzantine Mediterranean world, maintained contacts with the northern Balkans and engaged in long-distance trade.

== History ==
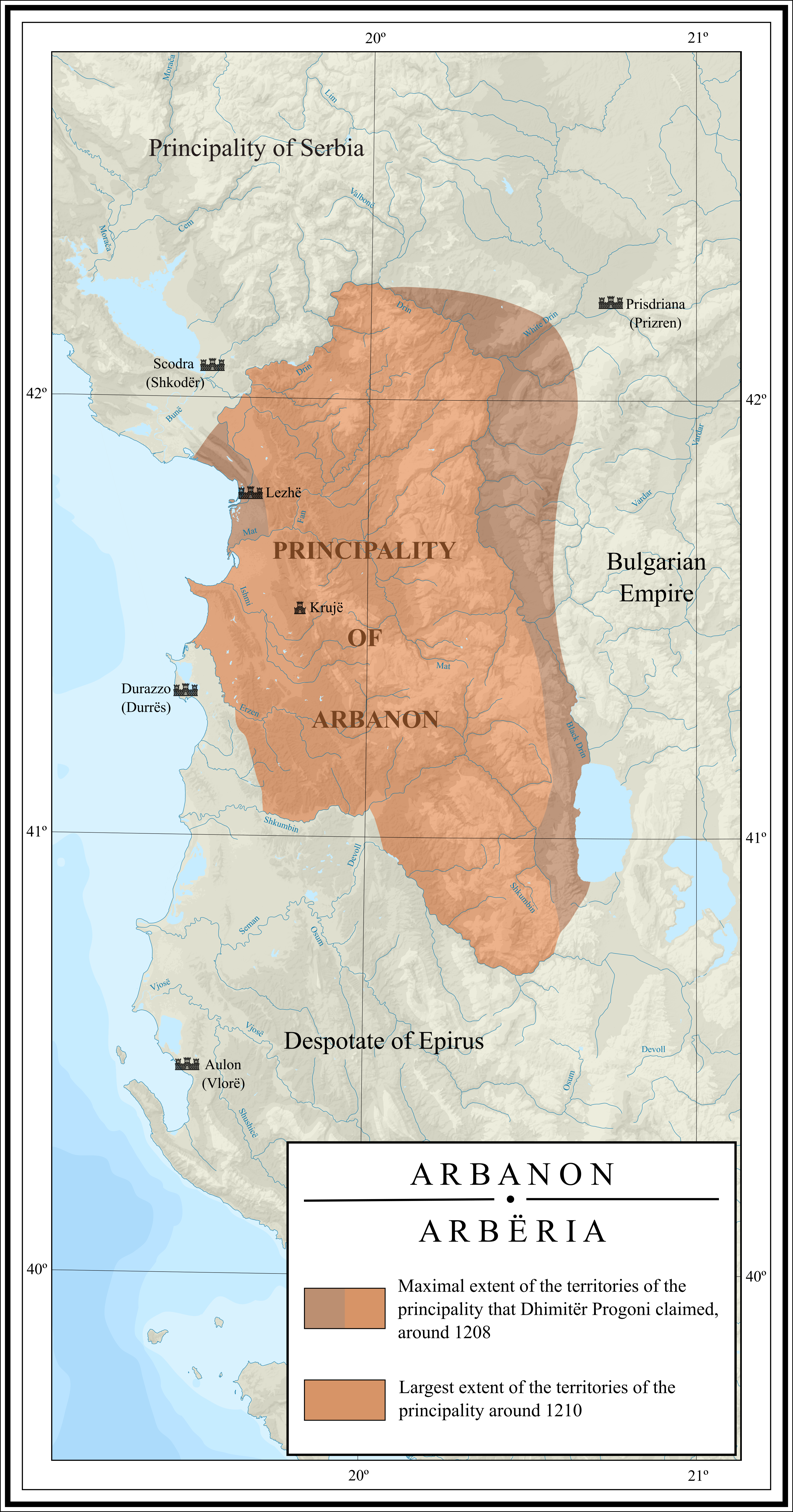
Map of the Principality of Arbanon

=== Principality of Arbanon ===
Arbanon was an autonomous principality that existed between the late 12th century and the 1250s. Throughout its existence, the principality was an autonomous dependency of its neighbouring powers, first Byzantium and, after the Fourth Crusade, Epirus, while it also maintained close relations with Serbia. Arbanon extended over the modern districts of central Albania, with the capital at Kruja, and it did not have direct access to the sea. Progon was the first ruler, believed to have ruled in ca. 1190. He was succeeded by his sons Gjin (r. c. 1200–08) and Dimitri (r. 1208–16). After this dynasty, the principality came under Greek lord Gregory Kamonas and then his son-in-law Golem. Dimitri's widow, Serbian princess Komnena Nemanjić, had inherited the rule and remarried Kamonas. Arbanon declined after a rebellion against Nicaea in favour of Epirus in 1257–58.

=== Kingdom of Albania ===
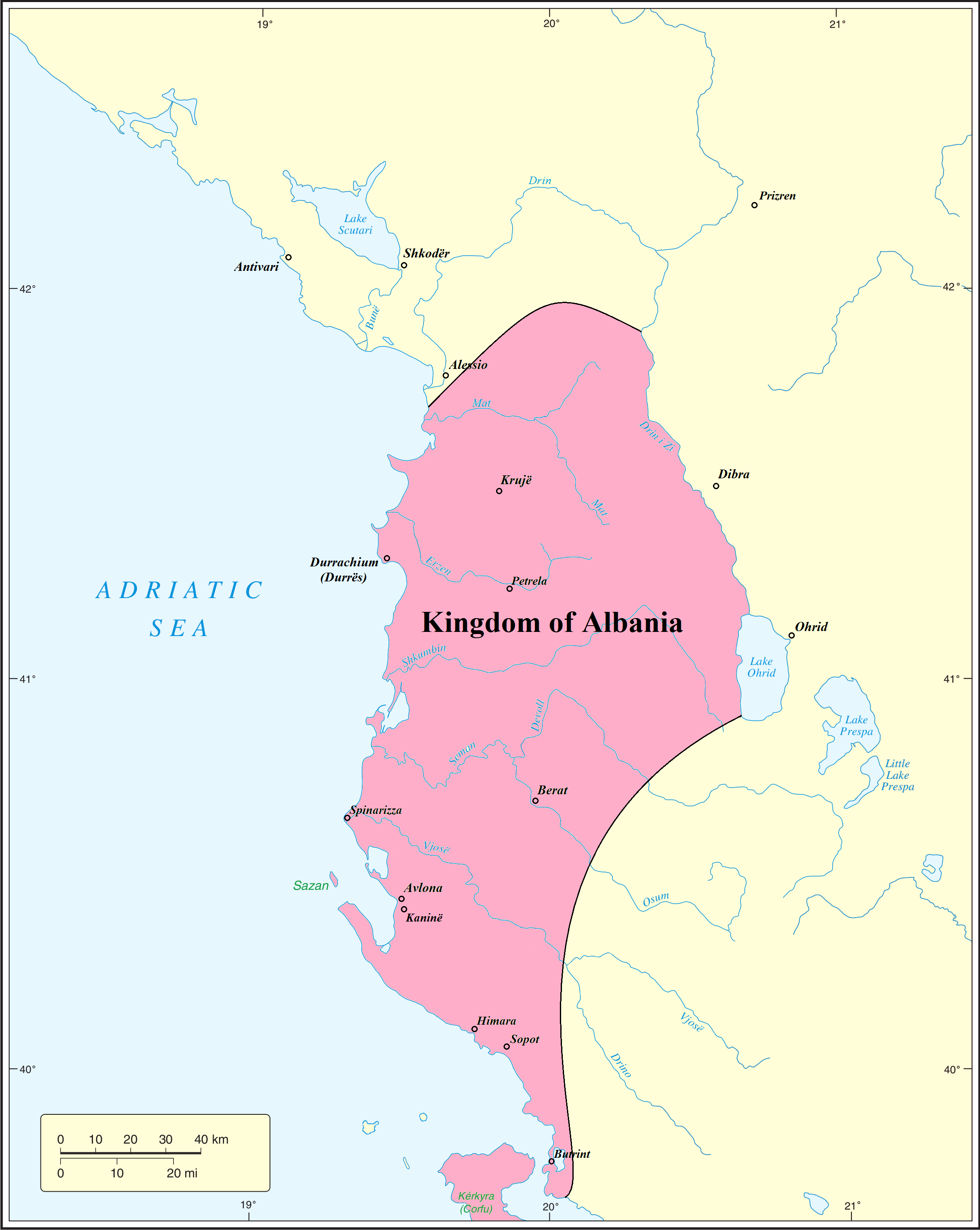
Kingdom of Albania at its maximum extent

After the fall of the Principality of Arber in its territories and in territories captured by the Despotate of Epiros was created the Kingdom of Albania, which was established by Charles of Anjou. He took the title of King of Albania in February, 1272. The kingdom extended from Durazzo (modern Durrës) south along the coast to Cape Linguetta, with vaguely defined borders in the interior. A Byzantine counter-offensive soon ensued, which drove the Angevins out of the interior by 1281. The Sicilian Vespers further weakened the position of Charles, and the Kingdom was soon reduced by the Epirotes to a small area around Durrës. The Angevins held out here, however, until 1368, when the city was captured by Karl Thopia.

After the fall of the Principality of Arber in territories captured by the Despotate of Epirus, the Kingdom of Albania was established by Charles of Anjou. He took the title of King of Albania in February 1272. The kingdom extended from the region of Durrës (then known as Dyrrhachium) south along the coast to Butrint. After the failure of the Eighth Crusade, Charles of Anjou returned his attention to Albania. He began contacting local Albanian leaders through local catholic clergy. Two local Catholic priests, namely John from Durrës and Nicola from Arbanon, acted as negotiators between Charles of Anjou and the local noblemen. During 1271 they made several trips between Albania and Italy eventually succeeding in their mission.

On 21 February 1272, a delegation of Albanian noblemen and citizens from Durrës made their way to Charles' court. Charles signed a treaty with them and was proclaimed King of Albania "by common consent of the bishops, counts, barons, soldiers and citizens" promising to protect them and to honor the privileges they had from Byzantine Empire. The treaty declared the union between the Kingdom of Albania (Latin: Regnum Albanie) with the Kingdom of Sicily under King Charles of Anjou (Carolus I, dei gratia rex Siciliae et Albaniae). He appointed Gazzo Chinardo as his Vicar-General and hoped to take up his expedition against Constantinople again. Throughout 1272 and 1273 he sent huge provisions to the towns of Durrës and Vlorë. This alarmed the Byzantine Emperor, Michael VIII Palaiologos, who began sending letters to local Albanian nobles, trying to convince them to stop their support for Charles of Anjou and to switch sides. However, the Albanian nobles placed their trust on Charles, who praised them for their loyalty. But Charles of Anjou imposed a military rule on Kingdom of Albania.

Throughout its existence the Kingdom saw armed conflict with the Byzantine empire. By 1282 the Angevins were weakened by the Sicilian Vespers but held control of the nominal parts of Albania and even recaptured some and held out until 1368 when the kingdom's territory was reduced to a small area in Durrës. Even before the city of Durrës was captured, it was landlocked by Karl Thopia's principality. Declaring himself as Angevin descendant, with the capture of Durrës in 1368 Karl Thopia created the Princedom of Albania. During its existence Catholicism saw rapid spread among the population which affected the society as well as the architecture of the Kingdom.A Western type of feudalism was introduced and it replaced the Byzantine Pronoia.

=== Albanian Principalities ===
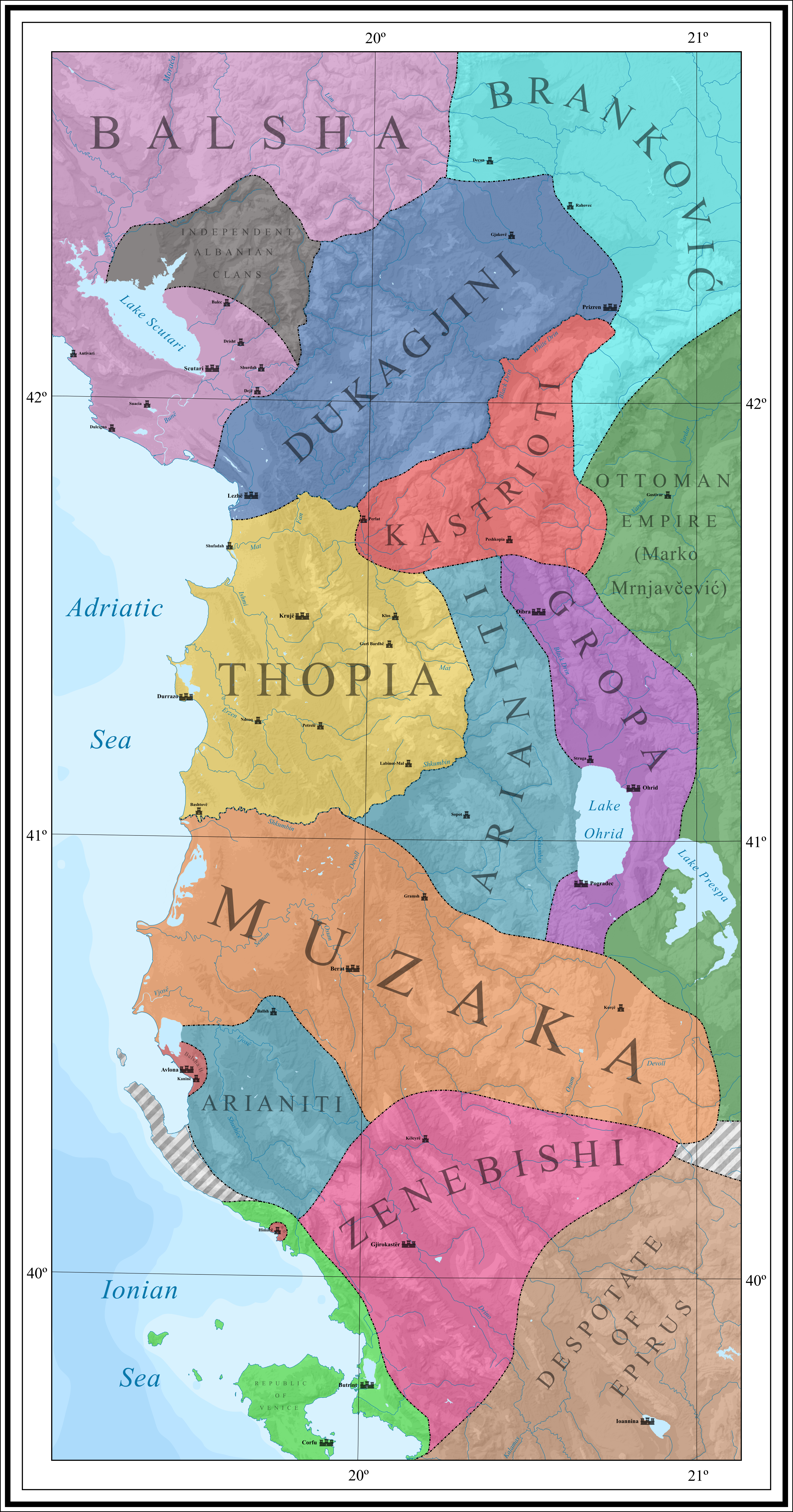
Albanian principalities over the territory of modern Albania, ca. 1390

The 14th century and the beginning of the 15th century was the period in which sovereign principalities were created in Albania under Albanian noblemen. Those principalities were created between the fall of the Serbian Empire and the Ottoman invasion of Albania.

In the summer of 1358, Nikephoros II Orsini, the last despot of Epirus of the Orsini dynasty, fought against the Albanian chieftains in Acheloos, Acarnania. The Albanian chieftains won the war and they managed to create two new states in the southern territories of the Despotate of Epirus. Because a number of Albanian lords actively supported the successful Serbian campaign in Thessaly and Epirus, the Serbian Tsar granted them specific regions and offered them the Byzantine title of despotes in order to secure their loyalty.

The two Albanian lead states were: the first with its capital in Arta was under the Albanian nobleman Pjetër Losha, and the second, centered in Angelokastron, was ruled by Gjin Bua Shpata. After the death of Pjetër Losha in 1374, the Albanian Despotate of Arta and Angelocastron were united under the rule of Despot Gjin Bua Shpata. The territory of this despotate was from the Corinth Gulf to Acheron River in the North, neighboring with the Principality of Gjon Zenevisi, another state created in the area of the Despotate of Epirus.

From 1335 until 1432 four main principalities were created in Albania. The first of them was the Muzakaj Principality of Berat, created in 1335 in Berat and Myzeqe. The most powerful was the Princedom of Albania, formed after the disestablishment of Kingdom of Albania, by Karl Thopia. The principality changed hands between the Thopia dynasty and the Balsha dynasty, until 1392, when it was occupied by the Ottoman Empire. When Skanderbeg liberated Kruja and reorganised the Principality of Kastrioti, the descendant of Gjergj Thopia, Andrea II Thopia, managed to regain control of the Princedom. Finally, it was united with other Albanian Principalities forming the League of Lezhë in 1444.

Another principality was the Principality of Kastrioti, created by Gjon Kastrioti, and later captured by the Ottoman Empire. Finally, it was liberated by the national hero of Albania, Gjergj Kastrioti Skanderbeg. The Principality of Dukagjini extended from the Malësia region to Prishtina in Kosovo.

=== League of Lezhë ===
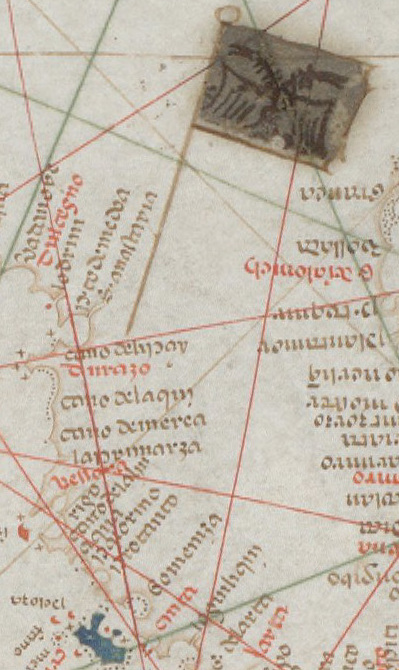
15th century Flag of Albania

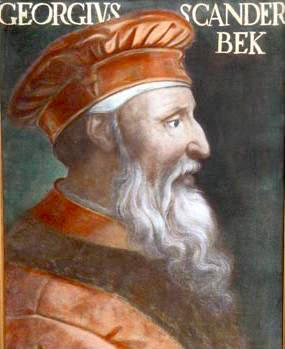
Gjergj Kastrioti Skanderbeg, leader of the League of Lezhë

Under pressure by the Ottoman Empire, the Albanian Principalities were united into a confederation, created in the Assembly of Lezhë on 2 March 1444. The league was led by Gjergj Kastrioti Skanderbeg, and by Lekë Dukagjini following his death. Skanderbeg organized a meeting of Albanian nobles: the Arianiti, Dukagjini, Spani, Thopias, Muzakas, and the leaders of the free Albanian principalities from high mountains, in the town of Lezhë, where the nobles agreed to fight together for mutual gain against the common Turkish enemy. They voted Skanderbeg as their suzerain chief. The League of Lezhë was a confederation and each principality kept its sovereignty.

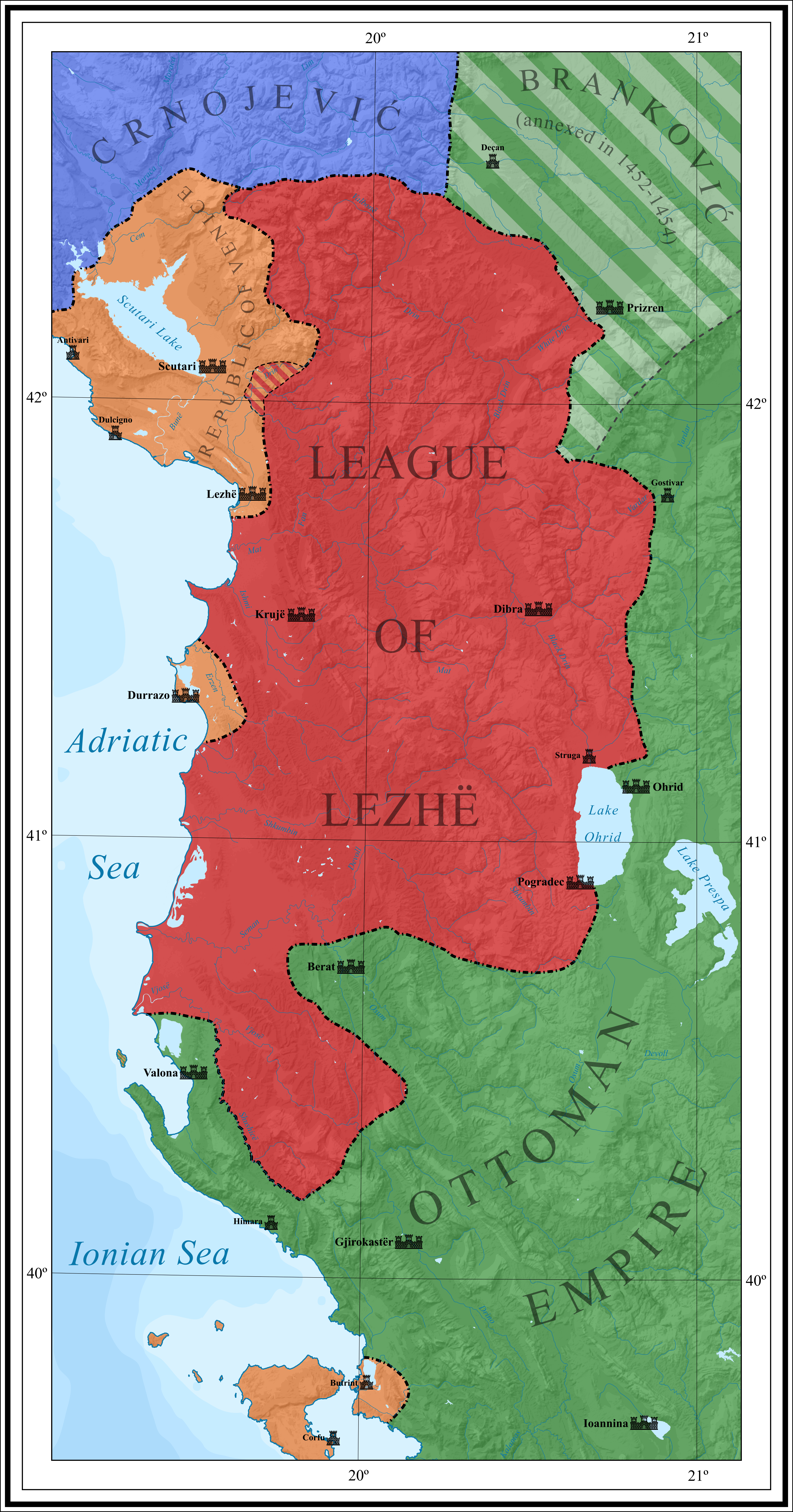
League of Lezhë, between 1448 and 1468 in the Albanian-Ottoman wars

In the light of the modern geopolitical science, the League of Lezhë represented an attempt to form a state union. In fact, this was a federation of independent rulers who undertook the duty to follow a common foreign policy, to jointly defend their independence and recruit their allied armed forces. Naturally, it required a collective budget for covering the military expenditures; each family contributed their mite to the common funds of the League.

At the same time, each clan kept its possessions and autonomy, to solve internal problems within its own estate. The formation and functioning of the League, of which Gjergj Kastrioti was the supreme feudal lord, was the most significant attempt to build up an all-Albanian resistance against the Ottoman occupation and, simultaneously, an effort to create, for the span of its short-lived functioning, of some sort of a unified Albanian state. Under Skanderbeg's command, the Albanian forces marched east, capturing the cities of Dibra and Ohrid. For 25 years, from 1443 – 1468, Skanderbeg's 10,000 men army marched through Ottoman territory, winning victory after victory against the consistently larger and better supplied Ottoman forces. Threatened by Ottoman advances in their homeland, Hungary, and later Naples and Venice, their former enemies, provided the financial backbone and support for Skanderbeg's army.

On 14 May 1450, an Ottoman army, larger than any previous force encountered by Skanderbeg or his men, stormed and overwhelmed the castle of the city of Krujë. This city was particularly symbolic to Skanderbeg as he had been previously appointed suba of Krujë in 1438 by the Ottomans. The fighting lasted four months, with an Albanian loss of over 1,000 men and over 20,000 for the Ottomans. The Ottoman forces were unable to capture the city and had no choice but to retreat before winter set in. In June 1446, Mehmed II, known as "the conqueror", led an army of 150,000 soldiers back to Krujë, but failed to capture the castle. Skanderbeg's death in 1468 did not end the struggle for independence, and fighting continued until 1481, under Lekë Dukagjini, when Albanian lands were finally forced to succumb to the Ottoman forces.

== Foreign invasions and Imperial rule ==
=== Byzantine Empire ===
After the region fell to the Romans in 168 BC it became part of Epirus Nova that was in turn part of the Roman province of Macedonia. Later it was part of provinces of the Byzantine Empire called themes.

When the Roman Empire was divided into East and West in 395, the territories of modern Albania became part of the Byzantine Empire. Beginning in the first decades of Byzantine rule (until 461), the region suffered devastating raids by Visigoths, Huns, and Ostrogoths. In the 6th and 7th centuries, the region experienced an influx of Slavs.

At the time of the South Slavic incursion and the threat of ethnic turbulence in the Albanian-inhabited regions, the Christianization of the Albanians had already been completed and it had apparently developed for Albanians as a further identity-forming feature alongside the ethnic-linguistic unity. Church administration, which was controlled by a thick network of Roman bishoprics, collapsed with the arrival of the Slavs. Between the early 7th century and the late 9th century the interior areas of the Balkans were deprived of church administration, and Christianity might have survived only as a popular tradition on a reduced degree.

The reorganization of the Church as a cult institution in the region took a considerable amount of time. The Balkans were brought back into the Christian orbit only after the recovery of the Byzantine Empire and through the activity of Byzantine missionaries. In 726 Leo III established de jure the jurisdiction of the Ecumenical Patriarchate of Constantinople over the Balkans, as the Church and the State established an institution. The Eastern Church expanded its influence in the area along with the social and political developments. Between the 7th and 12th centuries a powerful network of cult institutions were revived completely covering the ecclesiastical administration of the entire present-day Albanian-speaking compact area. In particular an important role was played by the Theme of Dyrrhachium and the Archdiocese of Ohrid. Survived through the centuries, the Christian belief among Albanians became an important cultural element in their ethnic identity. Indeed, the lack of Old Church Slavonic terms in Albanian Christian terminology shows that the missionary activities during the Christianization of the Slavs did not involve Albanian-speakers. In a text compiled around the beginning of the 11th century in the Old Bulgarian language, the Albanians are mentioned for the first time with their old ethnonym Arbanasi as half-believers, a term which for Eastern Orthodox Christian Bulgarians meant Catholic Christian. The Great Schism of 1054 involved Albania separating the region between Catholic Christianity in the north and Orthodox Christianity in the south.

The Albanians appear in medieval Byzantine chronicles in the 11th century, as Albanoi and Arbanitai, and in medieval Latin sources as Albanenses and Arbanenses, gradually entering in other European languages, in which other similar derivative names emerged. In later Byzantine usage, the terms Arbanitai and Albanoi, with a range of variants, were used interchangeably, while sometimes the same groups were also called by the classicising name Illyrians.

The Albanians, during the Middle Ages, referred to their country as Arbëria (Gheg Albanian: Arbënia) and called themselves Arbëreshë (Gheg Albanian: Arbëneshë).

=== Bulgarian Empire ===
In the mid-9th century most of eastern Albania became part of the First Bulgarian Empire, during the reign of Khan Presian. The area, known as Kutmichevitsa, became an important Bulgarian cultural center in the 10th century with many thriving towns such as Devol, Glavinitsa (Ballsh) and Belgrad (Berat). Coastal towns such as Durrës remained in the hands of the Byzantines for most of that period. When the Byzantines managed to conquer the Bulgarian Empire in 1018–19, the fortresses in eastern Albania were some of the last Bulgarian strongholds to be submitted by the Byzantines. Durrës was one a centre of a major Bulgarian uprising in 1040–41 following the discontent of the Bulgarian population by the heavy taxes levied by the Byzantines. Soon the rebellion encompassed the whole of Albania, but it was quelled in 1041, after which Albania again came under Byzantine rule. In 1072 another uprising broke out under Georgi Voiteh but it was also crushed.

Later the region was recovered by the Second Bulgarian Empire. The last Bulgarian Emperor to govern the whole territory was Ivan Asen II (1218–1241) but after his successors the Bulgarian rule diminished.

=== Serbian Empire ===
The Serbs controlled parts of what is now northern and eastern Albania toward the end of the 12th century. Internal power struggles further weakened the Byzantine Empire in the 14th century, enabling Serbian most powerful medieval ruler, Stefan Dusan, to establish a short-lived empire that included all of Albania except Durrës.

=== Despotate of Epirus ===
In 1204, after Western crusaders sacked Constantinople, Venice won nominal control over Albania and the Epirus region of northern Greece and took possession of Durrës. A prince from the overthrown Byzantine ruling family, Michael Comnenus, made alliances with Albanian chiefs and drove the Venetians from lands that now make up southern Albania and northern Greece, and in 1204 he set up an independent principality, the Despotate of Epirus, with Ioannina in northwest Greece) as its capital.

=== Kingdom of Sicily ===
Between 1258 and 1267, parts of Albania came under the rule of the Hohenstaufen dynasty of Sicily, during the reign of Manfred, King of Sicily. After campaigns against the Empire of Nicaea, Manfred captured the Albanian cities of Durrës, Vlorë, Spinarica, and Berat. He established Durrës as his main seat of power in Albania. Through his alliance with the Despotate of Epirus that was sealed due to his marriage to Helena Angelina Doukaina, Hohenstaufen control expanded to southern Albania and other nearby territories including Himarë, Butrint, Sopot, and Corfu. Despite small setbacks following the 1259 Battle of Pelagonia Hohenstaufen authority in Albania endured until Manfred's defeat and death at the 1266 Battle of Benevento, after which Albanian lands passed to the Angevins.

== Culture and Society ==
=== Background ===
In the latter part of the Middle Ages, Albanian urban society reached a high point of development. Foreign commerce flourished to such an extent that leading Albanian merchants had their own agencies in Venice, Ragusa (modern Dubrovnik, Croatia), and Thessalonica (now Thessaloniki, Greece). The prosperity of the cities also stimulated the development of education and the arts. Albanian, however, was not the language used in schools, churches, and official government transactions. Instead, Greek and Latin, which had the powerful support of the state and the church, were the official languages of culture and literature.

The new administrative system of the themes, or military provinces created by the Byzantine Empire, contributed to the eventual rise of feudalism in Albania, as peasant soldiers who served military lords became serfs on their landed estates. Among the leading families of the Albanian feudal nobility were the Thopia, Shpata, Muzaka, Arianiti, Dukagjini and Kastrioti. The first three of these rose to become rulers of principalities that were practically independent from Byzantium.

=== Cities ===
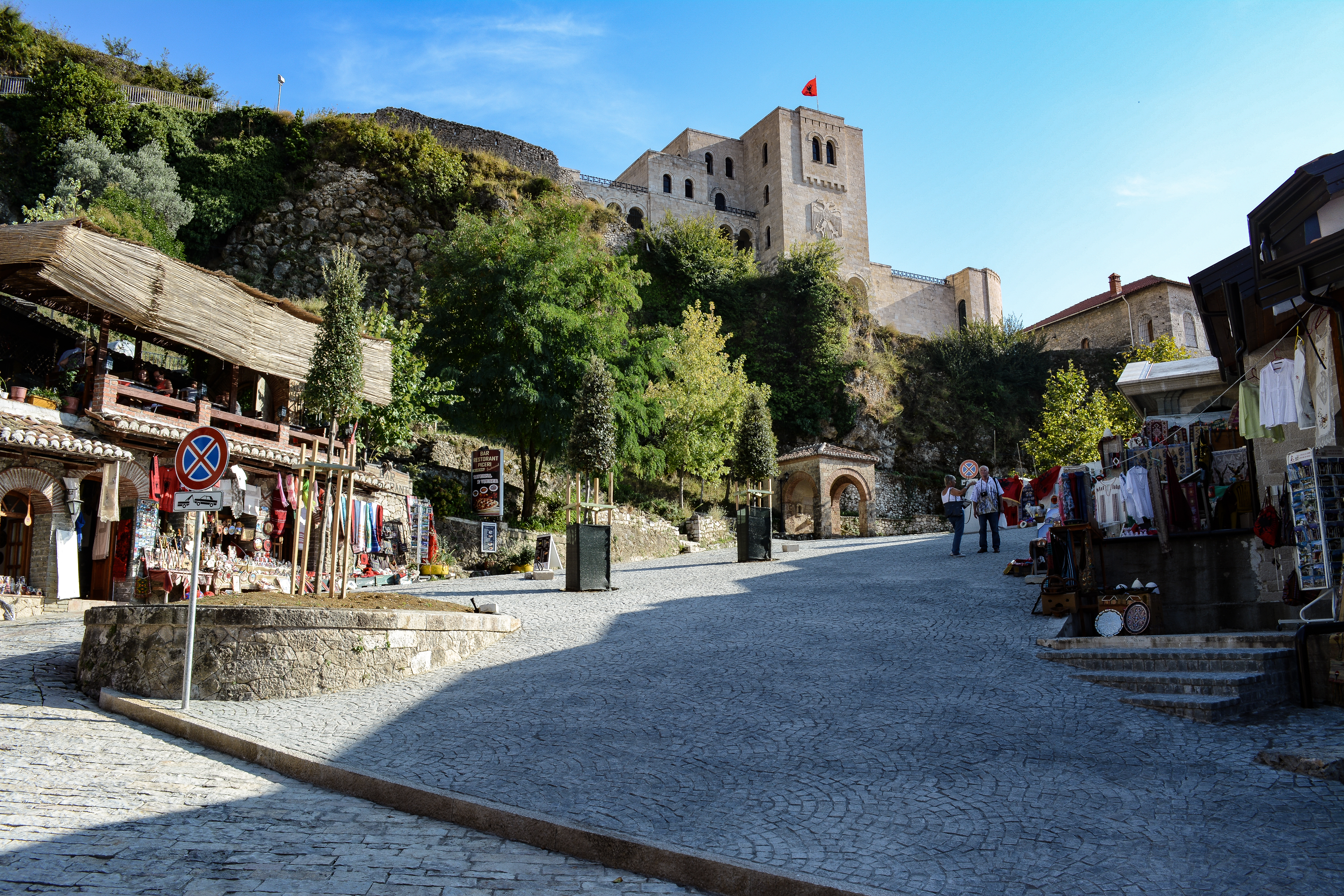
Medieval architecture in Krujë.

In the 14th and 15th centuries, the cities of Albania marked a slight but permanent progress. A number of new urban centers appeared around the coasts and river valleys. The Albanian cities were distinguished with development of craftsmanship, in particular the craftsmanship of jewelry, furring, carpentry, construction and gunsmithing. Craftsmanship development also induced internal and foreign trade, particularly with the Italian trade cities and with Dubrovnik. The internal trade was developed through the old and new trading routes, influencing positively the significant connections of ethnic Albanian provinces.

Besides the existing cities, a number of new centers appeared, in the vicinity of rivers and in the river valleys, including Shirgj on the coast of river Bojana, Shufadaja in the valley of Mati, Pirgu and Spinarica in the valley of Seman river. Durrës was the largest city. It was one of the main centers for trade and politics of the country. In the second half of the 14th century the population of this city was 25,000 inhabitants. In Northern Albania, after Durrës, the second largest was Shkodër, which was surrounded by a number of smaller cities like Bar, Ulcinj, Šas, Balec, Sepa and Lezhë.

The main cities in the south were Berat, Vlorë, Ioannina and Preveza. Following the fall of Durrës, from the beginning of the 15th century, Vlorë was becoming the main center in the Albanian coastline, followed by Gjirokastër, Korçë, Bradashesh (near present-day Elbasan) being towns with a relatively small number of population.

=== Trade and craftsmanship ===
Through the 13th and 14th centuries in Albanian cities, a development and specialisation of trade was noticed. A series of factors impacted in this aspect, worth to be mentioned are: increase of population in the cities, the need for craftsmanship products, technical enhancement, the short distance to the mines of iron, lead and silver in Serbian Hvosno. The craftsmanship of iron processing was especially widespread in Serbian Hvosno, and afterwards in other cities as well. Agricultural tools were produced, home iron furnishings, nails and in particular weapons used to be produced. 93 Documents of time mention shops and craftsmen of jewelry, tailors, fur tradesmen, bakers, wax craftsmen, carpenters, forgers, gunsmiths, butchers etc.

For good products, the cities would gain goodwill beyond their respective regions. Thus Vlorë and Ulcinj were famous for production of swords; Shkodër and Ulcinj for casting belfries. In Shkodër and in Prizren gold and silver was processed for ornaments. They were even produced by craftsmen from the villages of monasteries. Albanian farriers in the region and beyond were distinguished for the original manners of shoe wearing to horses. Foreign countries were seeking stone carvers and bricklayers from Durrës, carpenters from Balec etc. From craftsmanship of most advanced wearing products were those of furring, shoemakers and tailors. The tailor used to beautifully decorate clothes, with golden embroiders and lines. As for production and processing of silk Vlorë, Shkodër, Drisht etc. were distinguished. There were potteries, candle makers, bakers and butchers, drink shops and taverns in different cities. In some sea coast cities, salt extraction was very important. At the sea coast several plants existed for construction of ships.

Permanent connections of Prizren with Dalmatian, Italian and Albanian coastline cities, not only brought benefits to the city in economic aspect, but they also had their influence on transposing the reciprocal impacts in the field of culture, especially in figurative arts, in medicine, pharmacy and literature.

From a general observation of the geographical area, and of the economic and political life, it is found that the primary inter-provincial links in the territories inhabited by Albanians would pursue the horizontal directions (west-east), and three economic zones were formed: Upper Albania, Middle Albania and Lower Albania, which had their own trade route system.

=== Literature ===
Although most Albanian literature and language is unknown up until the 15th century, we know that Albanian has likely been written before Konrad Kyeser in 1402. The Archbishop of Antivari Guillaume Adam wrote a report in 1332 in which he said that Albanians used Latin letters in their books although their language was quite different from the Latin language.

=== Religion ===
==== Christianity ====
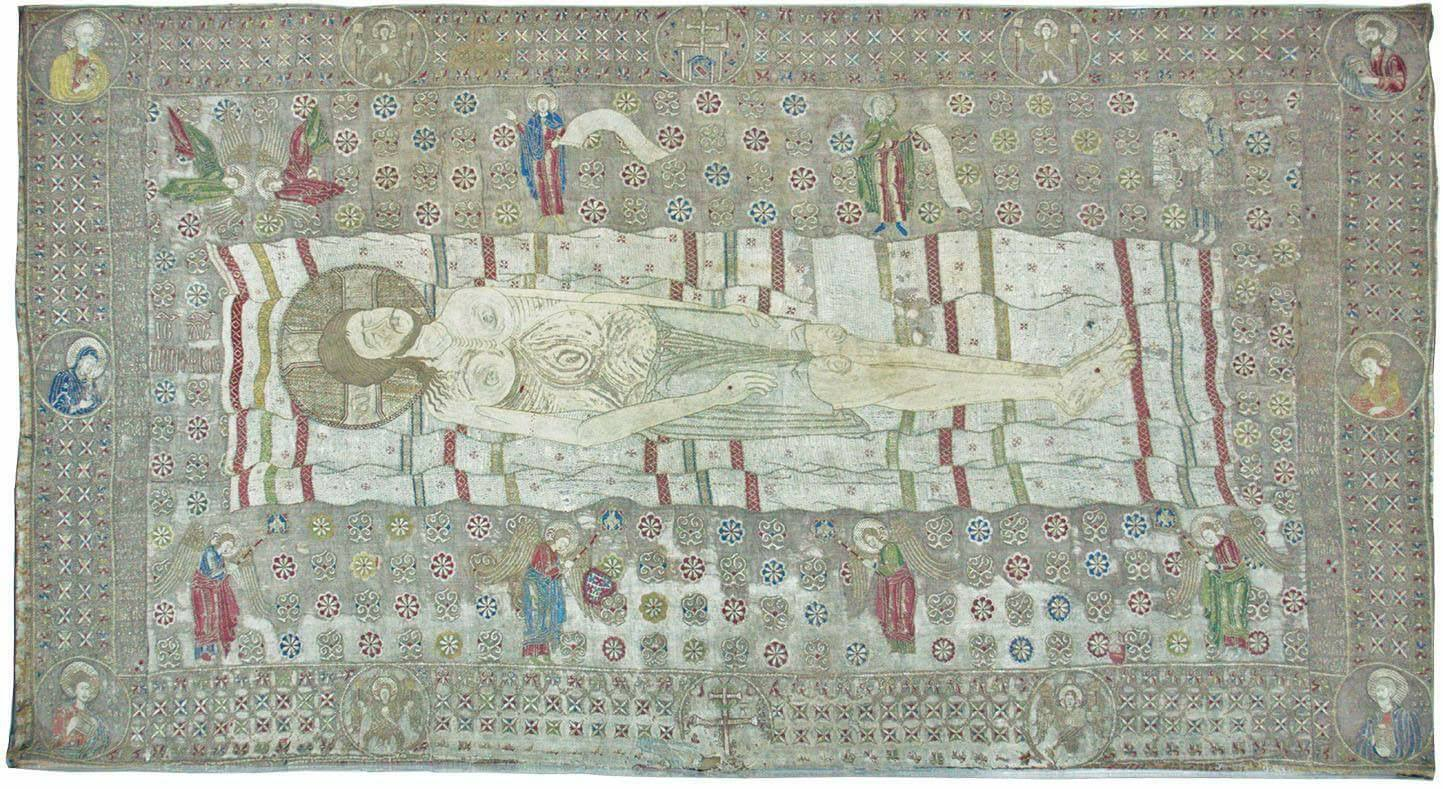
Epitaph of Gllavenica, the highlight of medieval Albanian art that was commissioned by Gjergj Arianiti in 1373.

In medieval Albania, Christianity was the most common religion and this remained up until the Islamization of Albania during the period of Ottoman Albania. The northern Albanians adhered to Catholicism, whilst in the south they were followers of Eastern Orthodoxy Many Albanian nobles had made significant religious constructions and contributions, as well as having their own portraits.

==== Spread of Bogomilism ====
Bogomilism, a neo-Gnostic Christian movement started by the 10th-century Bulgarian priest Bogomil, had become increasingly popular, and one of the main followed Christian denominations in medieval Albania up until the 14th-century. A medieval Albanian “Leka” attested around 1070, was one of the leaders of the Bogomil movements in Sofia. Bogomilism in Albania was also the cause for the spread of the movement in Italy. In the 13th-century, Bogomils in Northern Italy began referring to their church as the “Albanian Church” (Latin: ecclesia Albanensis).

==== Paganism ====
Albanians of the time period were Christian’s as a result of the Christianization of Albania, but many continued to uphold pagan beliefs to demons, evil spirits, fairies and mythical figures and beings.

== See also ==
- Albanian cities during the Middle Ages
- Medieval Albanian coinage
- Statutes of Shkodër
- Statutes of Drisht
- Statutes of Durrës

== Sources ==
- Demiraj, Bardhyl (2002). "Einheitlichkeit und Spaltung im Laufe des Christianisierungsprozesses der Albaner. Eine ethno-linguistische Fallstudie" (PDF). Studime (in German). Academy of Albanological Studies: 23–41.
- Demiraj, Bardhyl (2011). "Rrënjë dhe degë të krishterimit ndër shqiptarë" (PDF). Hylli i Dritës (in Albanian). 2. Shkodër: 58–78.
- Ducellier, Alain (1999), "Albania, Serbia and Bulgaria", in Abulafia, David (ed.), The New Cambridge Medieval History, Volume V: c. 1198-c. 1300, Cambridge University Press, pp. 779–795, ISBN 0-521-36289-X
- Elsie, Robert (2003). Early Albania: A reader of Historical texts, 11th–17th centuries. Wiesbaden: Otto Harrassowitz Verlag. ISBN 978-3-447-04783-8.
- Fine, John V. A Jr. (1991). The early Medieval Balkans; A critical survey from the sixth to the late twelfth century. The University of Michigan Press. ISBN 0-472-08149-7.
- Fischer, Bernd J.; Schmitt, Oliver Jens (2022). A Concise History of Albania. Cambridge University Press. ISBN 9781009254908.
- Hill, Stephen (1992), "Byzantium and the Emergence of Albania", Warwick Studies in the European Humanities, pp. 40–57, doi:10.1007/978-1-349-22050-2_4, ISBN 978-1-349-22052-6
- Ducellier, Alain (1981), La Façade maritime de l'Albanie au Moyen Age: Durazzo et Valona du XIe au XVe siècle, Thessaloniki: Institute for Balkan studies, OCLC 492625425
- Galaty, Michael; Lafe, Ols; Lee, Wayne; Tafilica, Zamir (2013). Light and Shadow: Isolation and Interaction in the Shala Valley of Northern Albania. The Cotsen Institute of Archaeology Press. ISBN 978-1-931745-71-0.
- Finlay, George (1851). The History of Greece: From Its Conquest by the Crusaders to Its Conquest by the Turks, and of the Empire of Trebizond: 1204–1461. London: Blackwood.
- Frashëri, Kristo (1964). The history of Albania: a brief survey. Tirana. OCLC 230172517.
- Nallbani, Etleva (2017). "Early Medieval North Albania: New Discoveries, Remodeling Connections: The Case of Medieval Komani". In Gelichi, Sauro; Negrelli, Claudio (eds.). Adriatico altomedievale (VI-XI secolo) Scambi, porti, produzioni (PDF). Università Ca' Foscari Venezia. ISBN 978-88-6969-115-7. Archived from the original (PDF) on 9 October 2022.
- Nicol, Donald McGillivray (1957). The Despotate of Epiros. Oxford: Blackwell & Mott, Limited.
- Nicol, Donald MacGillivray (1986). Studies in Late Byzantine History and Prosopography. London: Variorum Reprints. ISBN 978-0-86078-190-5.
- Curta, Florin (2021). The Long Sixth Century in Eastern Europe. BRILL. ISBN 978-90-04-45698-3.
