= Medieval Albanian coinage =

Historical coinage of Albania

The first attested coinage minted and issued in Albanian lands dates to the 14th–15th centuries when several Albanian principalities began minting their own coins. Prior to this period foreign currencies were widely circulated in the Albanian territories, including Venetian, Byzantine, Neapolitan Angevin as well as Serbian coinage. In addition to the feudal rulers there were several cities of Venetian Albania, such as Shkodër (Scutari), Durrës (Dyrrhachium), Drisht (Drivastum), etc., that minted their own currency and possessed autonomy while still under Venetian rule. While they were not fully independent the cities still maintained local administrative institutions as evidenced by the Statutes of Scutari, Statutes of Durazzo, and Statutes of Drivasto. Coinage by Albanian principalities and cities ceased in the late 15th–16th centuries, following the Ottoman conquest of Albania, after which Ottoman coinage gradually replaced the local and Western currencies in Albania.

== Albanian principalities ==
=== Principality of Albania ===
Under the rule of Karl Thopia, Prince of Albania, the Thopia family, who ruled central Albania in the 14th-15th centuries, minted their own coins, alongside other Albanian noble families. Although no surviving examples of Thopia's coinage are currently documented.

=== Principality of Gropa ===
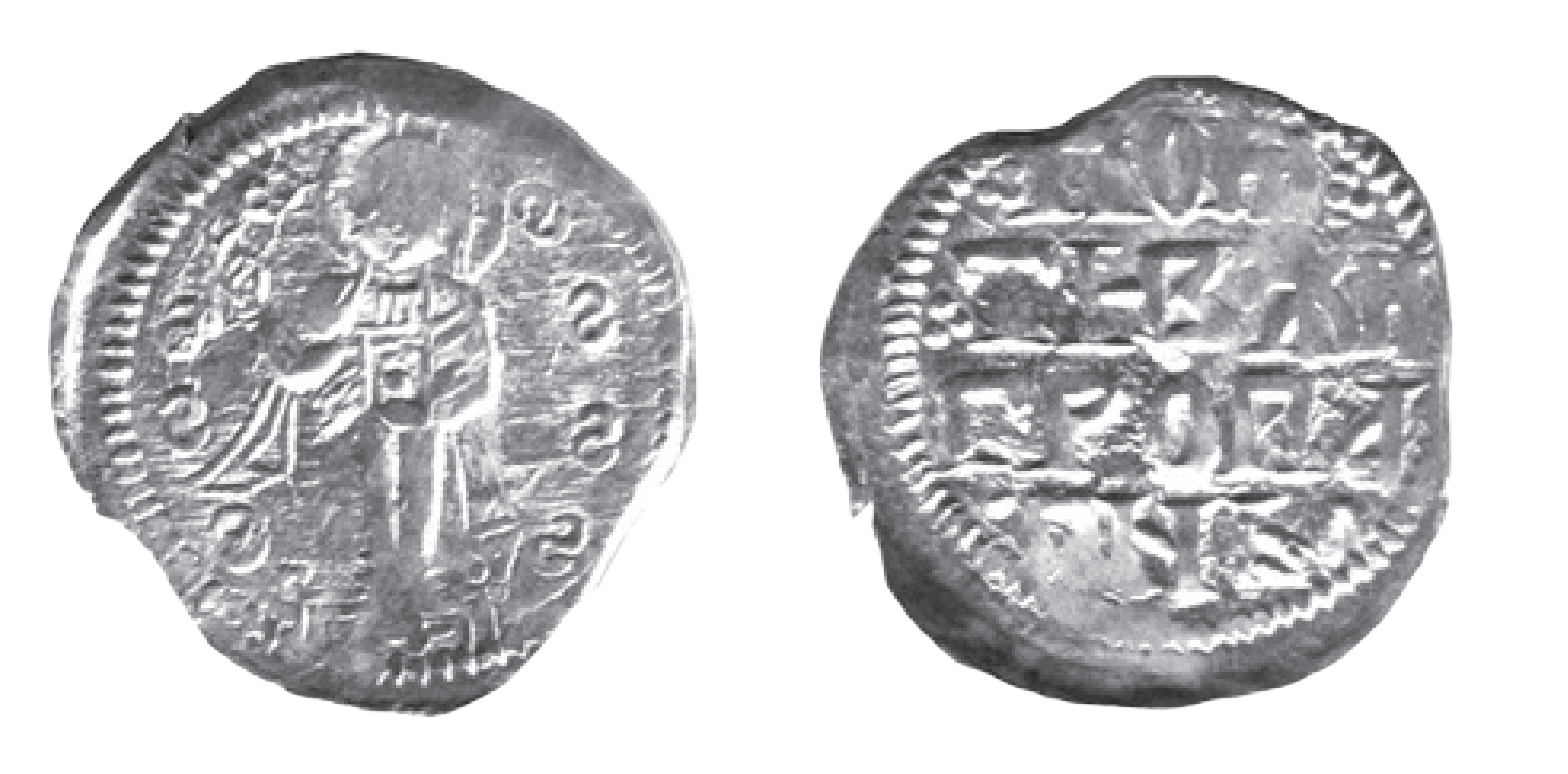
One of the four types of coins minted by Andrea Gropa in Ohrid.

Andrea Gropa, a 14th-century Albanian nobleman from the Gropa family, ruled Ohrid and its surrounding territories. He initially served as a vassal under Vukašin of Serbia, then he became independent after 1370. Between the years 1377 and 1385, Andrea minted his own coins, inscribed in Old Serbian with his titles as župan and gospodar and bearing his signature, Po milosti Božijoj župan Gropa. He struck his coins in Ohrid, including four known types of dinars that differ by the inscription on the reverse. The obverse depicts Christ standing on a supedaneum. Surviving examples have been found in Kičevo after 1918, in the vicinity of Pristina, and in Ohrid around 1970. Andrea was also the last Christian ruler of Ohrid before the Ottoman conquest.

=== Principality of Zeta ===
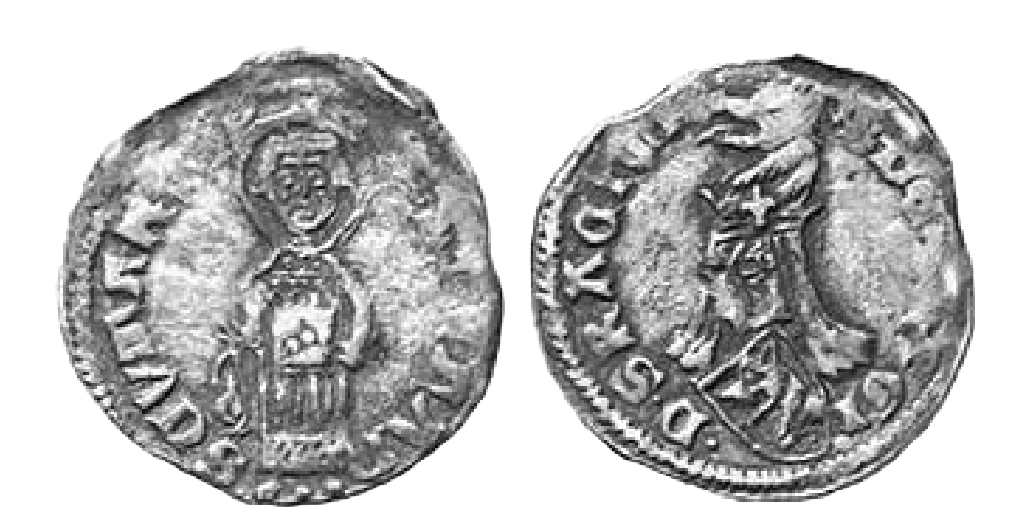
Coin of Gjergj II Balsha depicting Saint Stephen of Shkodra standing and the Coat of Arms of the Balsha family.

The Balsha family who were the rulers of Zeta from 1362 to 1421 and they were among the first Albanian families to mint their own coins. Gjergj I Balsha had issued six types of coins with Cyrillic inscriptions and depictions of Jesus Christ, as well as with the Balsha family coat of arms. Balsha II Minted one type of coins, he minted with Latin inscriptions and depiction Saint Stephen of Scutari, and the Balsha coat of arms. Gjergj II Balsha had produced two types of coins that featured the Balsha coat of arms and of the saints such as Saint Lawrence and Saint Stephen. Kostandin Balsha was an Ottoman vassal but still issued a coin with a depiction of Saint Stephen and himself depicted as a king, and it was inscribed in Latin. Balsha III had minted three types showing the Balsha family coat of arms and Saint Lawrence, who was the protector of the Balsha family.

== Albanian cities ==
=== Drisht ===
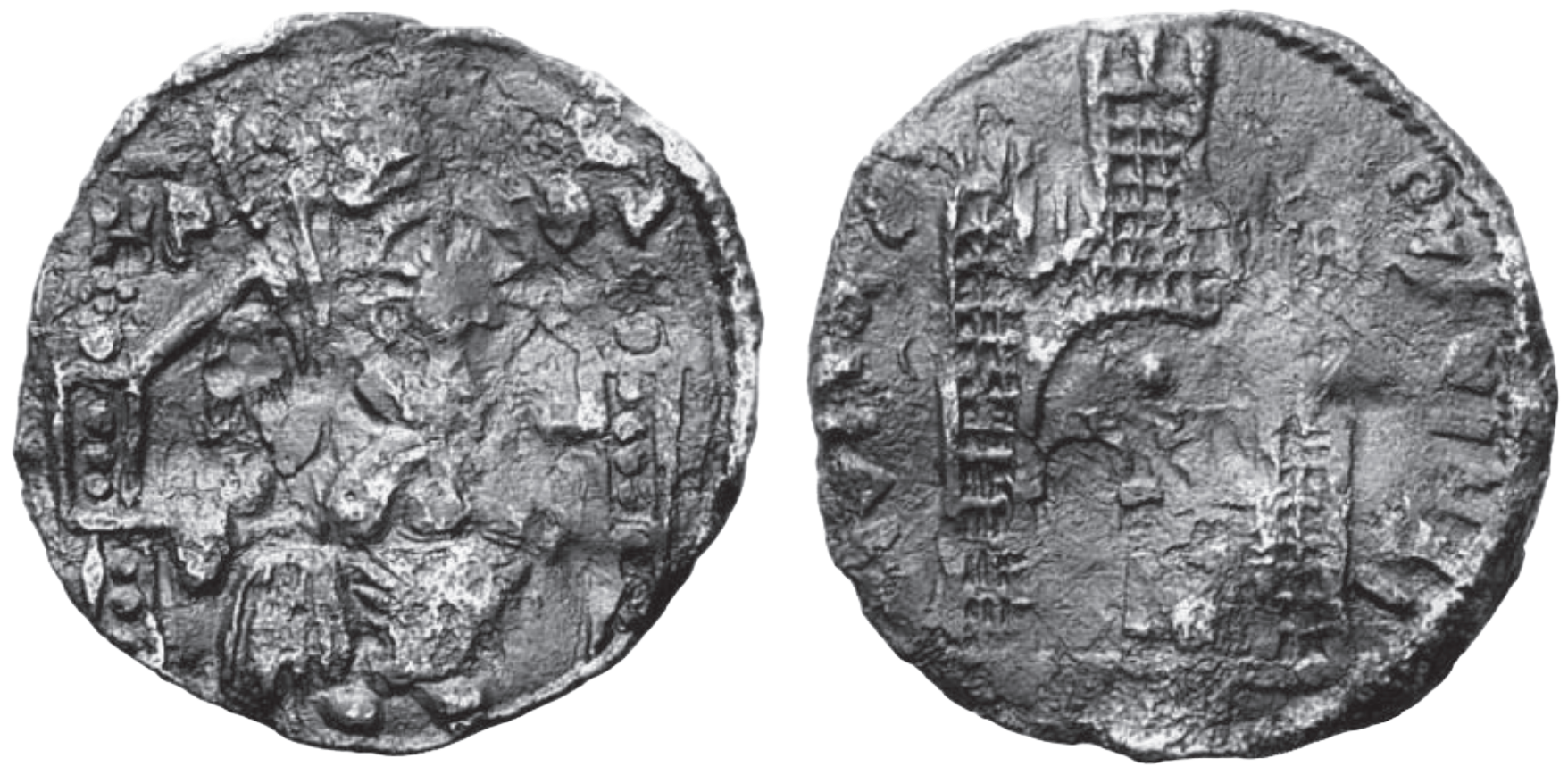
Coin from Drisht.

Drisht was a medieval Albanian town that issued its own autonomous coinage during the 13th–15th centuries. Coins from Drivast typically featured the city's tower on one side and Saint Mary which was the town's patron, on the other. The Two main types are documented as one showing the tower with the Latin name of the city and Saint Mary, and the second one with slight variations in iconography but retaining the same inscriptions. The coins of Drisht are marked with the legend “CIVITAS DRIVASTI”.

=== Shkodër ===
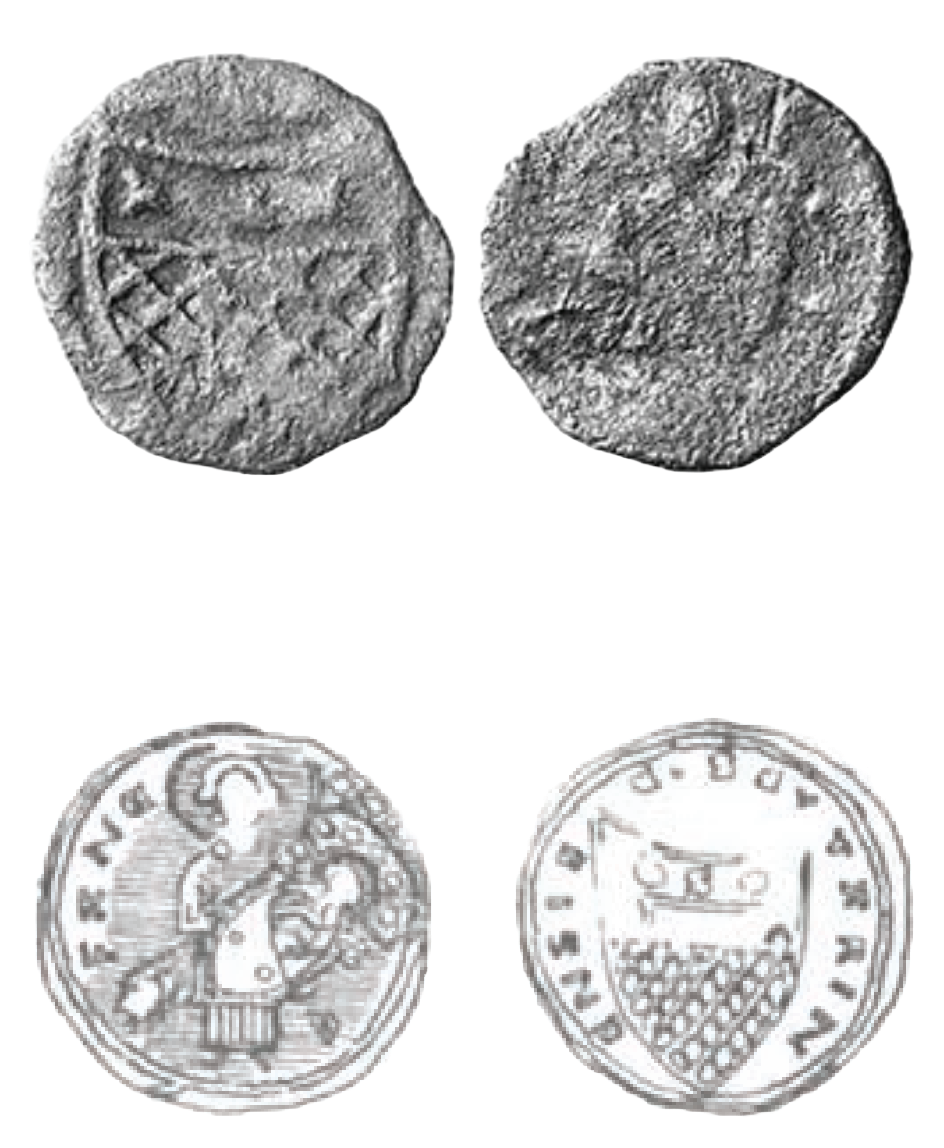
Coin from Shkodër depicting the Coat of Arms of the city and Saint Stephen holding Jesus Christ.

Shkodër was known as one of the largest and most economically developed cities in medieval Albania. Shkodër had a diverse coinage system that included copper follaro, perper, hyperpyron, ducat, and many other various forms of the Groschen. The groschen was one of the most commonly used denominations in the city, and it existed in large as well as small forms, with one groschen equal to 1/24 of a ducat. Over time, the quality of the groschen had declined due to impurities in the metal as well as the weight inconsistencies, which led to devaluation. There was Several distinct types of groschen circulated in Shkodër. Some examples were: Albanian groschen (grossi Albaniae) and Balsha groschen (grossi Balsae). By the early 15th century the exchange values of these coins became standardized compared to the larger currencies for example one ducat was equivalent to 6 Ragusa groschen, 30 Kotor groschen, 40 Albanian groschen, or 56 Balsha groschen. The Shkodër mint was operational since at least the early 15th century which produced coins that featuring the city's patron saint which was Saint Stephen as well as the city's emblem and coat of arms. Some scholars even have argued that Shkodërs coins were minted in Kotor, but archival evidence confirms the existence of a local mint in shkodër. Coins from Shkodra usually had an obverse typically depicts Saint Stephen and was either standing, seated, or holding the infant Jesus, while the reverse of the coin shows the city's emblem or a cross. The Coins also featured legends such as SAN STEFANUS SCUTARENSIS and CIVITAS SCUTARENSIS.

=== Kuçovë ===
In 1995, archeologists discovered a hoard of 902 Byzantine coins in Kuçovë from the 11th and 12th centuries attributed to the Komnenos, a Byzantine ruling dynasty. The hoard contains coins from various Byzantine emperors including Manuel I Komnenos, Andronikos I Komnenos and Manuel Angel Komnenos. The hoard was then handed over and evaluated at the National Historical Museum of Albania on September 28, 1995. According to the Medieval researcher Prof. Dr. Pëllumb Xhufi and numismatist Prof. Dr Shpresa Gjongecaj, the hoard represents an important period in Albanian history in which the territories of Albania became a centre of confrontation between the Byzantine empire and the western world. It is one of the rare hoards of this type found in the country. Inside the hoard, none of the gold or silver coins belong to the reign of Manuel I Komnenos which represents the reforms undertaken in the Byzantine economy in 1092. The coins have not yet been fully studied. Some of them have been partially restored by Prof. Dr. Fredrik Stamati, but the weight or percentage of silver has not yet been determined. The rest is preserved in good condition but still requires restoration with contemporary methods. In one of the coins minted in Constantinople during the reign of Manuel I Komnenos depicts Jesus seat with his back to a throne with IC XC to his left and holding the Gospel. On the other side of the coin depicts Manuel holding a Globus cruciger and wearing a veil on his head while being crowned by Mary, mother of Jesus.

== Venetian Albania Coinage ==
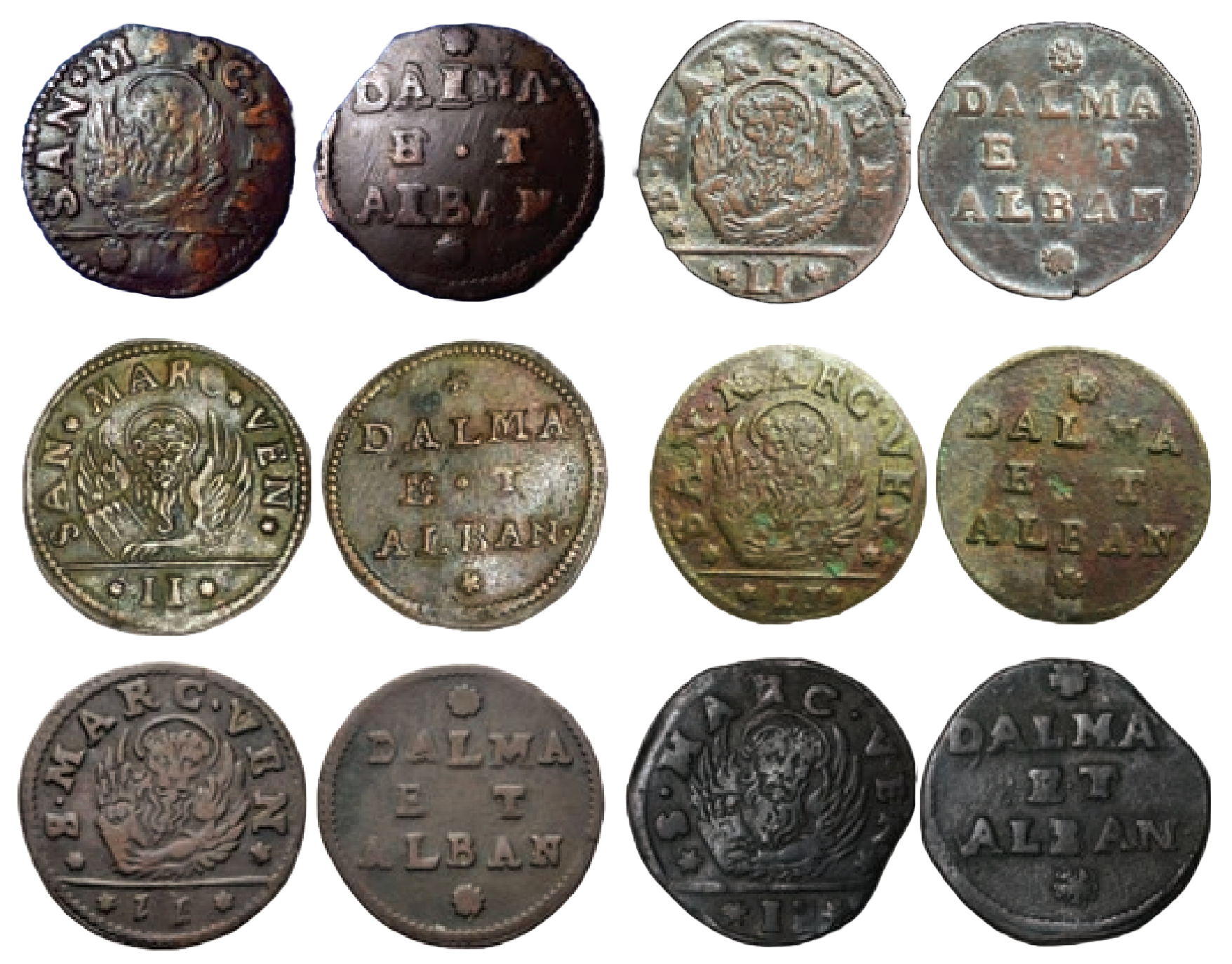
The DALMA ET ALBAN coin in Venetian Albania.

A copper coin inscribed DALMA ET ALBAN was minted under the authority of the Venetian Senate on August 17, 1684, at the mint in Zadar. The coin belongs to the Venetian “gazzetta” denomination and was produced for circulation in Venetian Albania. The obverse features a circular medallion with the inscription DALMA ET ALBAN, flanked by two asterisks. The reverse depicts St. Mark's lion and with the legend SAN’ MARC • VEN, with the Roman numeral II beneath. Measuring 29.5 mm in diameter and weighing 7.3 grams.

== See also ==
- Albanian lek
- Franga
- Korçë frange
- Economy of Albania
- Albanian nobility

== Bibliography ==
- American Numismatic Association (1964). American Numismatic Association. Federal Brand Enterprises. ISBN 978-1-5075-9567-1.
- Ivanišević, Vujadin (2001). Новчарство средњовековне Србије [Coinage of Medieval Serbia] (PDF) (in Serbian). Belgrade.
- Meta, Albana (2023). The Middle Ages A Forerunner of a Well-Organized Monetary System (PDF). Bank of Albania. ISBN 978-9-9282-6276-9.
- RADIĆ, Vesna; IVANIŠEVIĆ, Vujadin (2020). Српски средњовековни новац из збирке Слободанке Стојаковић [Serbian medieval coins from the collection of Slobodanka Stojaković] (PDF) (in Serbian). нумизматичар.
- Spasić, Slađana (2015). СРПСКИ СРЕДЊОВЕКОВНИ НОВАЦ [Serbian Medieval Coinage] (PDF) (in Serbian). НАРОДНИ МУЗЕЈ КРАЉЕВО.
- Stanojević, Stanoje (1925). Narodna enciklopedija srpsko-hrvatsko-slovenac̆ka [People’s Encyclopedia of Serbo-Croatian-Slovenian] (in Serbian). Izdavac̆: Bibliografski zavod d.d.
- Šufflay, Milan (1925). Srbi i Arbanasi (njihova simbioza u srednjem vijeku) [Serbs and Albanians (their symbiosis in the Middle Ages)] (in Serbian). Seminar za arbanasku filologiju.
- Zavalani, Tajar (2015). History of Albania. Centre for Albanian Studies. ISBN 978-1-5075-9567-1.
