= Albanian cities during the Middle Ages =

In the 14th and 15th centuries, the cities of Albania marked a slight but permanent progress. A number of new urban centers appeared around the coasts and river valleys. The Albanian cities were distinguished with development of craftsmanship, in particular the craftsmanship of jewelry, furring, carpentry, construction and gunsmithing. Craftsmanship development also induced internal and foreign trade, particularly with the Italian trade cities and with Dubrovnik. The internal trade was developed through the old and new trading routes, influencing positively the significant connections of ethnic Albanian provinces.

== Development of old cities and the rise of new cities ==
Medieval Albanian cities grew and developed during 14th and 15th centuries. Besides the existing cities, a number of new centers appeared, in the vicinity of rivers and in the river valleys, including Shirgj on the coast of river Bojana, Shufadaja in the valley of Mati, Pirgu and Spinarica in the valley of Seman river.

Durrës was the largest city. It was one of the main centers for trade and politics of the country. In the second half of the 14th century the population of this city was 25,000 inhabitants. In Northern Albania, after Durrës, the second largest was Shkodër, which was surrounded by a number of smaller cities like Bar, Ulcinj, Šas, Balec, Sepa and Lezhë.

The main cities in the south were Berat, Vlorë, Ioannina and Preveza. Following the fall of Durrës, from the beginning of the 15th century, Vlorë was becoming the main center in the Albanian coastline, followed by Gjirokastër, Korçë, Bradashesh (near present-day Elbasan) being towns with a relatively small number of population.

== Craftsmanship products ==
Through the 13th and 14th centuries in Albanian cities, a development and specialisation of trade was noticed. A series of factors impacted in this aspect, worth to be mentioned are: increase of population in the cities, the need for craftsmanship products, technical enhancement, the short distance to the mines of iron, lead and silver in Serbian Hvosno. The craftsmanship of iron processing was especially widespread in Serbian Hvosno, and afterwards in other cities as well. Agricultural tools were produced, home iron furnishings, nails and in particular weapons used to be produced. 93 Documents of time mention shops and craftsmen of jewelry, tailors, fur tradesmen, bakers, wax craftsmen, carpenters, forgers, gunsmiths, butchers etc.

For good products, the cities would gain goodwill beyond their respective regions. Thus Vlorë and Ulcinj were famous for production of swords; Shkodër and Ulcinj for casting belfries. In Shkodër and in Prizren, gold and silver was processed for ornaments. They were even produced by craftsmen from the villages of monasteries. Albanian farriers in the region and beyond were distinguished for the original manners of shoe wearing to horses. Foreign countries were seeking stone carvers and bricklayers from Durrës, carpenters from Balec etc.

From craftsmanship of most advanced wearing products were those of furring, shoemakers and tailors. The tailor used to beautifully decorate clothes, with golden embroiders and lines. As for production and processing of silk Vlorë, Shkodër, Drisht etc. were distinguished. There were potteries, candle makers, bakers and butchers, drink shops and taverns in different cities. In some sea coast cities, salt extraction was very important. At the sea coast several plants existed for construction of ships.

Cities played a significant role for connecting the provinces. Salt was one of the main items serving to interconnect the provinces, what was considered as the oil of middle ages. Lack of salt in internal territories in Serbian Hvosno had already linked for a long time now with the cities of Durrës, Shirgj and Lezhë. Also complete lack of minerals in the sea coast line cities dictated the need to strengthen the inter-provincial link. Caravans loaded with metals and agricultural and livestock items entered from Hvosno to Durrës, and also from other inner provinces of the country. Another factor of connecting provinces was meeting of tradesmen from Durrës in Ulcinj, Bar, Shkodër, Lezhë and in markets of river valleys.

Circulation was conducted, but with difficulties. At the main points, such as fords, bridges and ports where such roads ended, customs were set up, where the caravans had to pay taxes for crossing the goods. In some cases the customs tax was collected several times for the same good in the areas of one feudal. This significantly obstructed trade. However the internal circulation of goods from one province to the other induced some citizens to link different provinces of the country. Thus Shkodër used to link Albanian cities and territories from the northwest and northeast side. In the Central Albania, such a role was played by Durrës, whereas in the Southern Albania, there were Vlorë, Berat, etc.

In the first stage of trade exchanges, foreign Byzantine or Venetian coins were used as money, which were forged in gold and silver. But later, in the 13th and 14th centuries, local money were issued and used, which was forged in silver and bronze in the cities like Shas, Drisht, Bar, Ulcinj, Shkodër, Durrës.

== Foreign trade ==
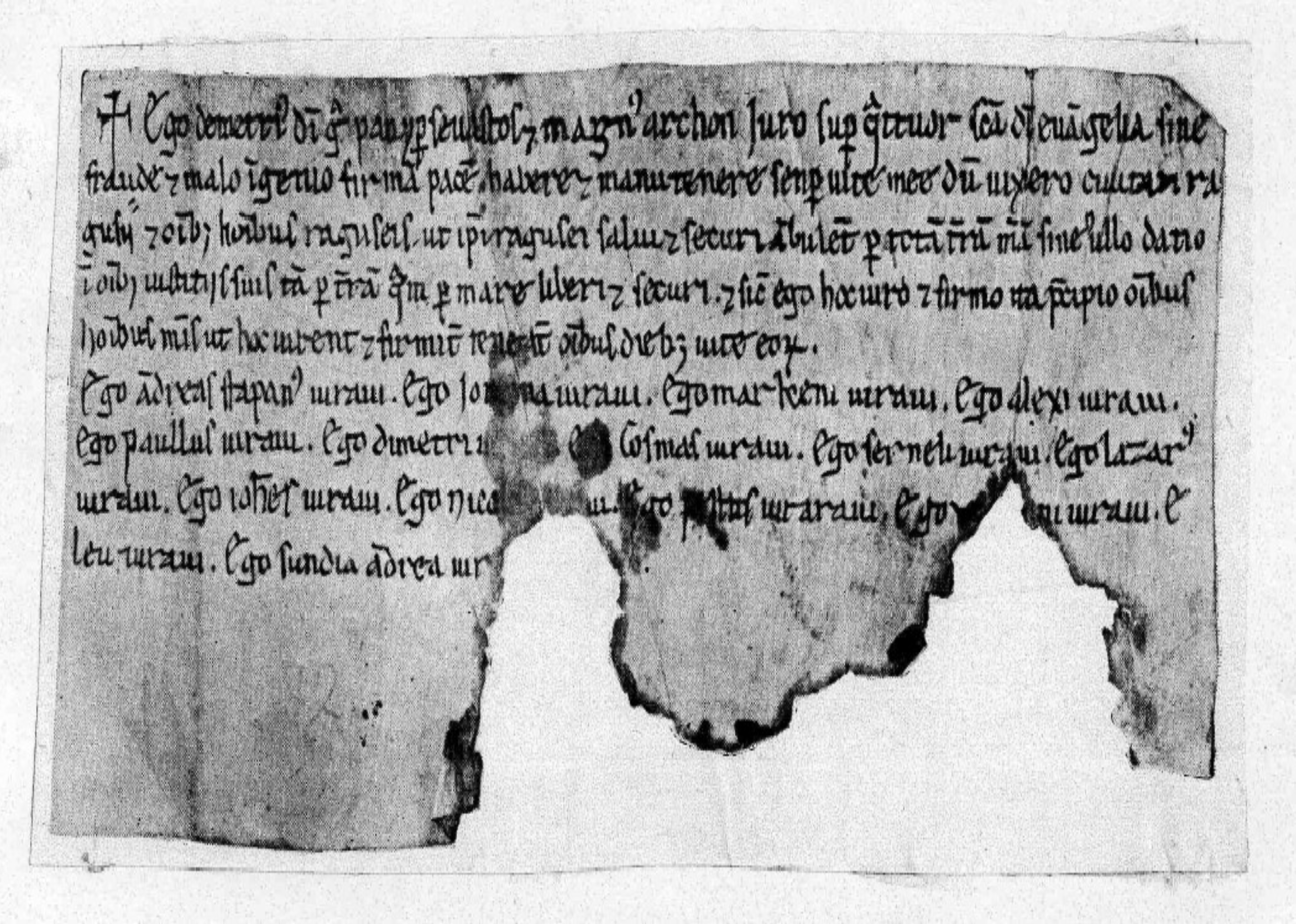
Reproduction of the 1210 Commercial Agreement between Demetrio Progoni of Arbanon and the Republic of Ragusa.

The Albanian cities also began to connect with cities of other Balkan countries and even beyond the sea. Such links were favored by empowerment of important trade cities in Italy, as for example in the 11th and 13th century were Amalfi and Venice, and later Dubrovnik in Dalmatia.

From the sources of that time, tradesmen from Durrës, Vlorë, Shkodër, Ulcinj and Bar developed their activity in Dubrovnik, Venice, Kotor, Budva, Corfu, etc. Albanian tradesmen went as far as to Egypt, Syria in east, whereas to the west as far as in Flanders. Albanian merchants have also been mentioned as merchants and seamen on the coasts of England during the 14th and 15th centuries. Amongst them Durres tradesmen were the most remarkable.

The main articles they traded included: salt, cereals, wood of different types, processed in the country plants, leather, tap, oil, honey, wax, salted fish, wine, metals, silk, types of meat etc. As for cereal trade, Durrës, Pirg, Shufadaja, Shirgj were distinguished.

In the middle ages, Albania was not only an exporting country, but importer as well. Before all, fabric was imported, mainly from Venice. In Venetian Albania, it was not allowed purchasing fabric from any other country but Venice. Wine, sugar and iron products were bought from Italy. Foreign trade of Albania was mainly developed by Venetian and Ragusa tradesmen. However, import was much larger than the export.

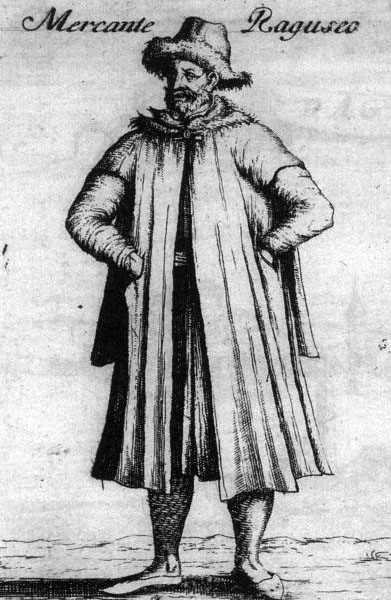
1708 illustration of a merchant from Ragusa

In the Albanian cities and markets, many foreign tradesmen developed their activity. According to the chronicle from Anna Komnene, since the 11th century, there were colonies of tradesmen from Amalfi and Venice in Durrës. Besides the Venetians, in Albanian cities, the tradesmen from Dubrovnik were present as well, also followed by those from Ortona, Rimini, Barletta, Ancona, Zadar, Kotor, Vidin, Thessaloniki, Florence etc. Venetian consuls settled in Durrës, Vlorë, Ulcinj etc. The consuls of Republic of Ragusa were settled to work for the interests of Dubrovnik. Foreign traders used to bring fabrics and cloth materials, weapons, ornaments, glasses, mirrors, expensive spices, sugar etc. They had ensured privileges from the Albanian feudal princes, who had waived their right to customs tax.

Permanent connections of Prizren with Dalmatian, Italian and Albanian coastline cities, not only brought benefits to the city in economic aspect, but they also had their influence on transposing the reciprocal impacts in the field of culture, especially in figurative arts, in medicine, pharmacy and literature.

== Trading routes ==
From a general observation of the geographical area, and of the economic and political life, it is found that the primary inter-provincial links in the territories inhabited by Albanians would pursue the horizontal directions (west-east), and three economic zones were formed: Upper Albania, Middle Albania and Lower Albania, which had their own trade route system.

There were four important trade routes going through Upper Albania, which linked the coastline with the eastern territories:

1. Dubrovnik - Crniče - Novi Pazar - Zvečan (Mitrovica) - Niš;
2. Sea coast (Kotor, Budva and Bar) - Breskovc (Pllava)- Peja – Kosovo Polje - Niš and the branches Kosovo Polje – Skopje;
3. Sea coast - Shkodër – Metohija – Kosovo Polje - Niš and the branches Kosovo Polje – Skopje;
4. Sea coast (Shufada, Lezhë) – Fan - Prizren – Kosovo Polje – Skopje and the branches Kosovo Polje – Skopje.

Two important trade routes went through Central Albania:

1. Sea coast (discharge canyon of Ishin river, Durrës) – Shkalla e Tujanit – Bulqizë – Debar - Tetovo- Skopje;
2. The road called Via Egnatia (Durrës - Ohrid - Bitola - Thessaloniki), being the most important route and the only one used by carts. It had many branches connecting with the system of roads of Upper Albania and Lower Albania.

In a horizontal plane, several roads were going through Lower Albania:

1. Sea coast (discharge canyons of Seman and Vjosa rivers) - Berat - Korçë Plain - Kastoria - Bitola - and the second branching Berat - Përmet - Ioannina;
2. Vlorë - along the river Vjosa - Lake Pamvotida;
3. Butrint - Gjirokastër;
4. Arta - Ioannina

Besides the above described routes, the ethnic Albanian territories were pervaded in vertical line by other trade routes. One used to go along the sea coastline territories, which were even better connected between them through the sea routes. Whereas the best trade route in horizontal line was going through the territories of eastern Albania and it used to connect important centers like: Niš, Skopje, Bitola, Kastoria, Ioannina, etc. This route, along with Via Egnatia and with many of their branches, must have played a primary role in homogenizing the ethno-cultural features of Albanians and on expansion of the medieval national name known as Arbër (Arbëri/Arbëni, Albani). The provinces of Middle and Upper Albania were linked with each other also with other routes going through vertical line, along the valley of Drin river etc.

== See also ==
- Statutes of Shkodër
- Statutes of Drisht
- Statutes of Durrës
- Medieval Albanian coinage

== Bibliography ==
- Jahja Drançolli, Qytetet e Kosovës gjatë mesjetes, Buletin i Fakultetit Filozofik XXVI/1996, Prishtinë, 2001, OCLC 162642138
- K. Biçoku, Viset etnike shqiptare në mesjetë, Studime Historike, Nr.1-4, Tiranë, 1995.
- Peter Bartl, Shqiperia nga mesjeta deri sot, Drita, Prizren, 1999.
- P. Thengjilli, Historia e popullit shqiptar 395–1875, Shblu, Tiranë, 1999, ISBN 99927-0-037-8
- Jahja Drançolli, Arbërit ndërmjet Perëndimit dhe Lindjes gjatë Mesjetës, Zagreb, 2008.
- Valter Shtylla, Rrugët dhe urat e vjetra në Shqipëri, Tiranë, 1997, ISBN 99927-1-013-6
- Noel Malcolm, Kosova – Një histori e shkurtër, KOHA, Prishtinë, 1998, Print
