= Spinarica =

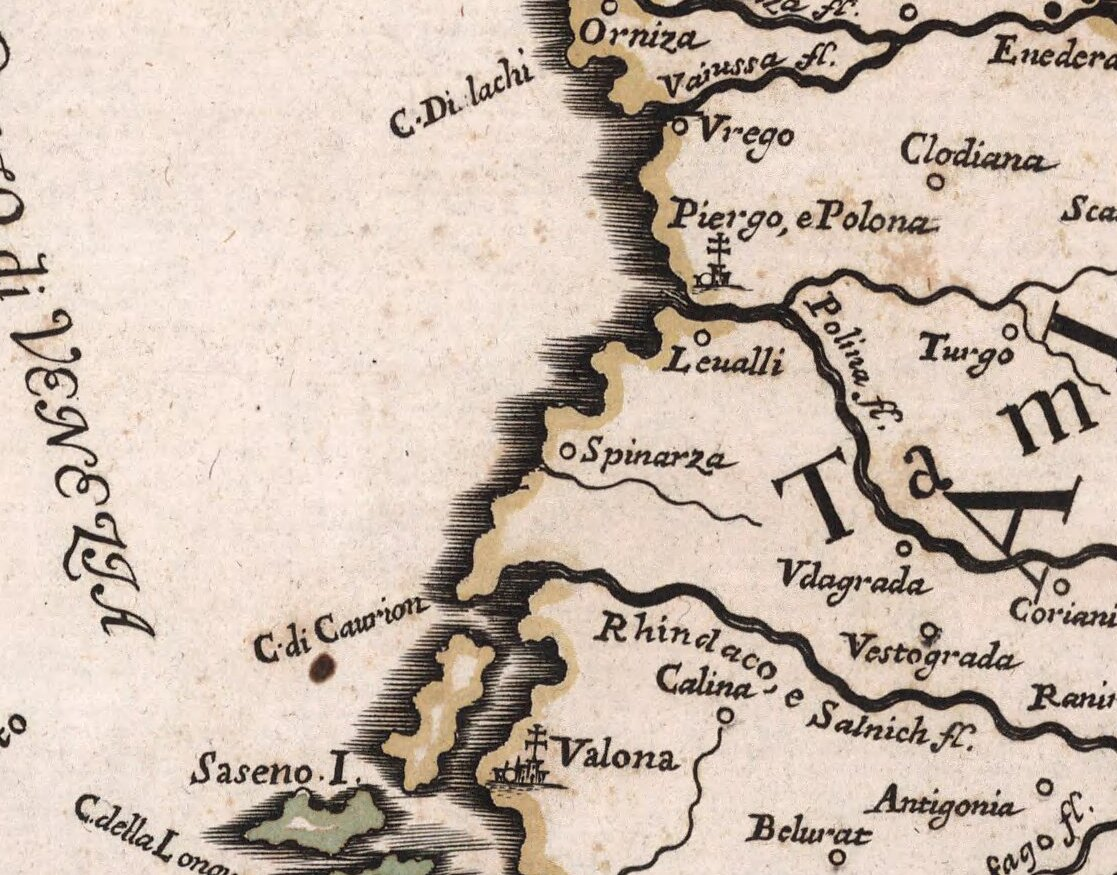
Map of Spinarica (Spinarza) on a 1684 map by Giacomo Cantelli.

Spinarica or Spinarizza was a medieval city on the mouth of Vjosa river in southern Albania. It was an important center of trade, a status boosted by its strategic location. During its existence the city was ruled by the Byzantines, Albanians, Venetians, Angevins, the Hohenstaufen dynasty and finally by the Ottomans. The exact reasons for Spinarica's decline are not known, though at the same period several important cities throughout Albania were abandoned due to socioeconomic issues caused by the Ottomans. The once prosperous city has been located by some scholars in the area of today's Zvërnec north of Vlorë.

== See also ==
- Medieval Albania
- Albanian cities during the Middle Ages
