= Ragusan perpera =

Dubrovačka perpera
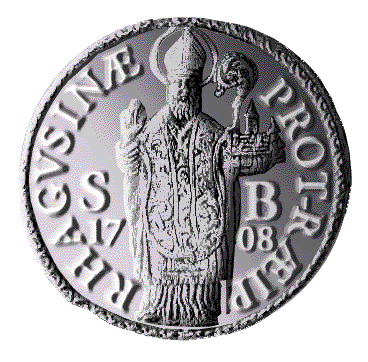
- Coin minted in 1708

Denominations
- Subunit
- 1/12: Ragusan denar
- Coins: minted between 1683 and 1803, weight: 3,98 grams - 6,42 grams, diameter: 26 millimeter - 29 millimeter

Demographics
- User(s): Republic of Ragusa/Republic of Dubrovnik
- This infobox shows the latest status before this currency was rendered obsolete.

The Ragusan perpera (Croatian: Dubrovačka perpera) or perpero was a type of silver coin issued and used in the Republic of Ragusa (Dubrovnik).

It was minted between 1683 and 1803 and depicted the image of Saint Blaise (Croatian: Sveti Vlaho), the patron of the Republic, on the obverse, carrying a model of the city of Ragusa (modern Dubrovnik) as well as a bishop's crosier in his left hand and giving a blessing with his right one. On both sides of the Saint there were letters (S and B = Sanctus Blasius) and numerical digits that represented year of minting. The obverse carried the edge inscription "PROT(ector)-RÆIP(ublicae)-RHAGVSINÆ". The reverse showed Jesus Christ and inscription "SALVS TVTA".

The coins of Ragusan perpera were issued in weights between 3,98 and 6,42 grams as well as in diameters between 26 and 29 millimeters. The subunits were Ragusan denars (one perpera equalled 12 denars) and Ragusan soldi (72 soldi for one perpera).

From 1801 to 1803 a half-perpera was minted in Dubrovnik, valued at 6 denars or 36 soldi. Its diameter was 20 millimeters.

== See also ==
- Perper
- List of historical currencies
