= Perper =

Perper may refer to:

== Currencies ==
- Hyperpyron, Byzantine coin
- Ragusan perpera, currency of the historical Republic of Ragusa
- Serbian perper, Serbian currency under Tsar Dusan
- Montenegrin perper, Montenegrin currency at the beginning of the 20th century

== People ==
- Joshua Perper (1932–2021, Bacău), Romanian-American forensic pathologist
- Iosif Perper (May 13, 1886, Arzis, Bessarabia - Dec 26, 1966, Moscow, Russia), Russian Editor and Journalist, the founder of the only Vegetarian Journal in Russia (January 1909 - May 1915)
- David Perper (born 1952), drummer

== Other uses ==
- Perper (band), Montenegrin rock band
- Perper, Iran, a village in East Azerbaijan Province, Iran
