= Statutes of Drivasto =

Statutes of Drivasto Statutet e Drishtit
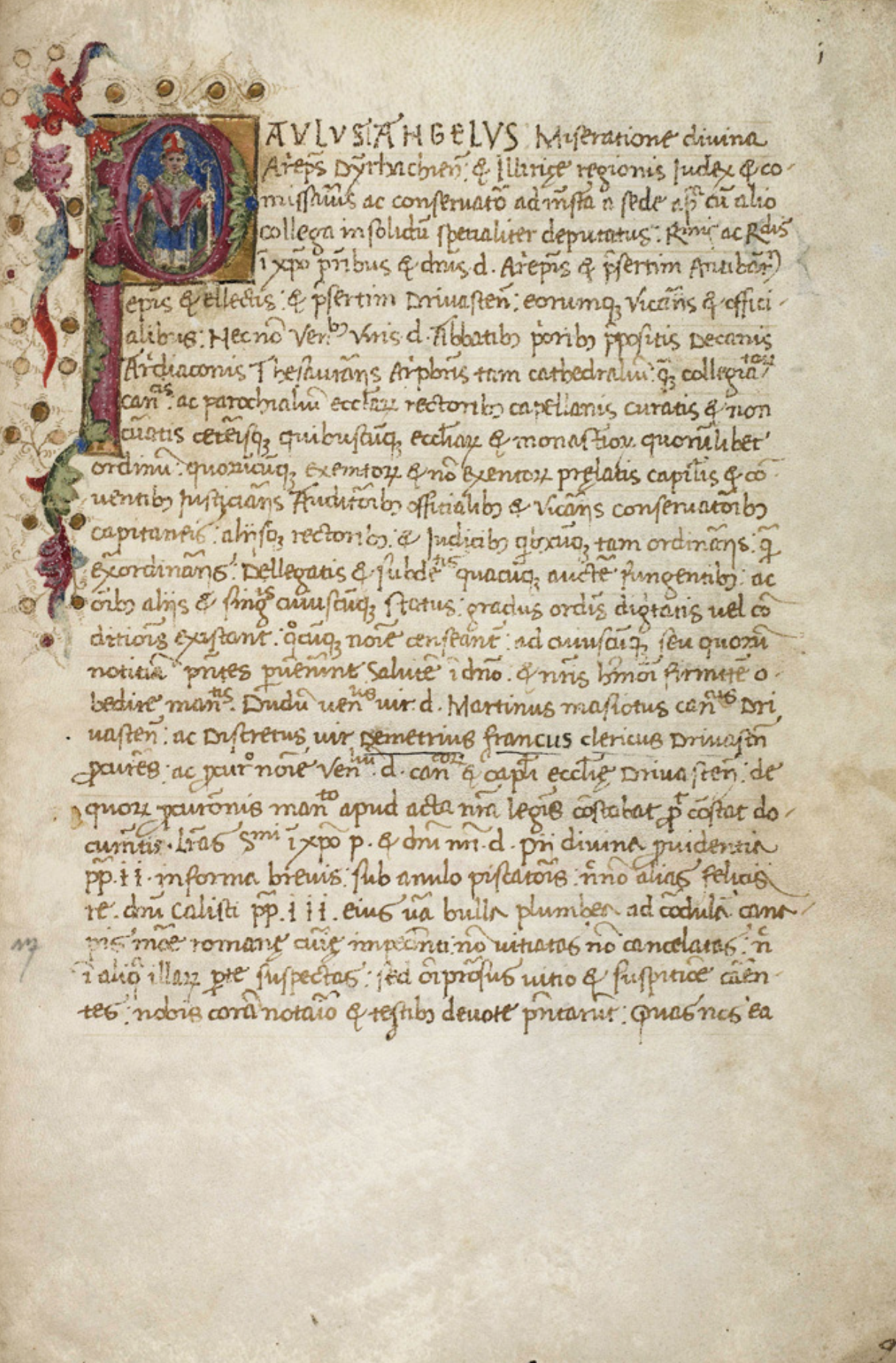
- Page from the Statute of Drivasto

Information
- Region: Venetian Albania

The Statutes of Drivasto or Statutes of Drisht (Albanian: Statutet e Drishtit) were the highest form of expression of self-government in the Albanian town of Drisht during the Middle Ages. Titled "Statuta et Ordinationes Capituli Ecclesiae Cathedralis Drivastensis", they were unique for the fact that the power of city governance was concentrated in the hands of the bishop of the Drisht Cathedral. The statues were issued by Albanian Archbishop Pal Engjëlli in November 1464.

== See also ==
- Statutes of Shkodër
- Statutes of Durrës
- Albanian cities during the Middle Ages
