= Statutes of Durazzo =

The Statutes of Durazzo or Statutes of Durrës (Albanian: Statutet e Durrësit) were the highest form of expression of self-government of the Albanian town of Durrës during Medieval Ages. Durrës had a long experience of self-government and privileges charters since confirmed by Byzantine Emperors. When the city was captured by Karl Thopia the statutes were hidden by the community, reappearing in 1392 when the city was handed over to Venetians. The Venetians confirmed the statutes of the city in 1392 and reconfirmed them in 1401 and 1423.

== See also ==
- Statutes of Shkodër
- Statutes of Drisht
- Albanian cities during the Middle Ages
- Duke of Durazzo (title)
