= Statutes of Scutari =

Albanian statues during Venetian rule

Statutes of Scutari Statutet e Shkodrës
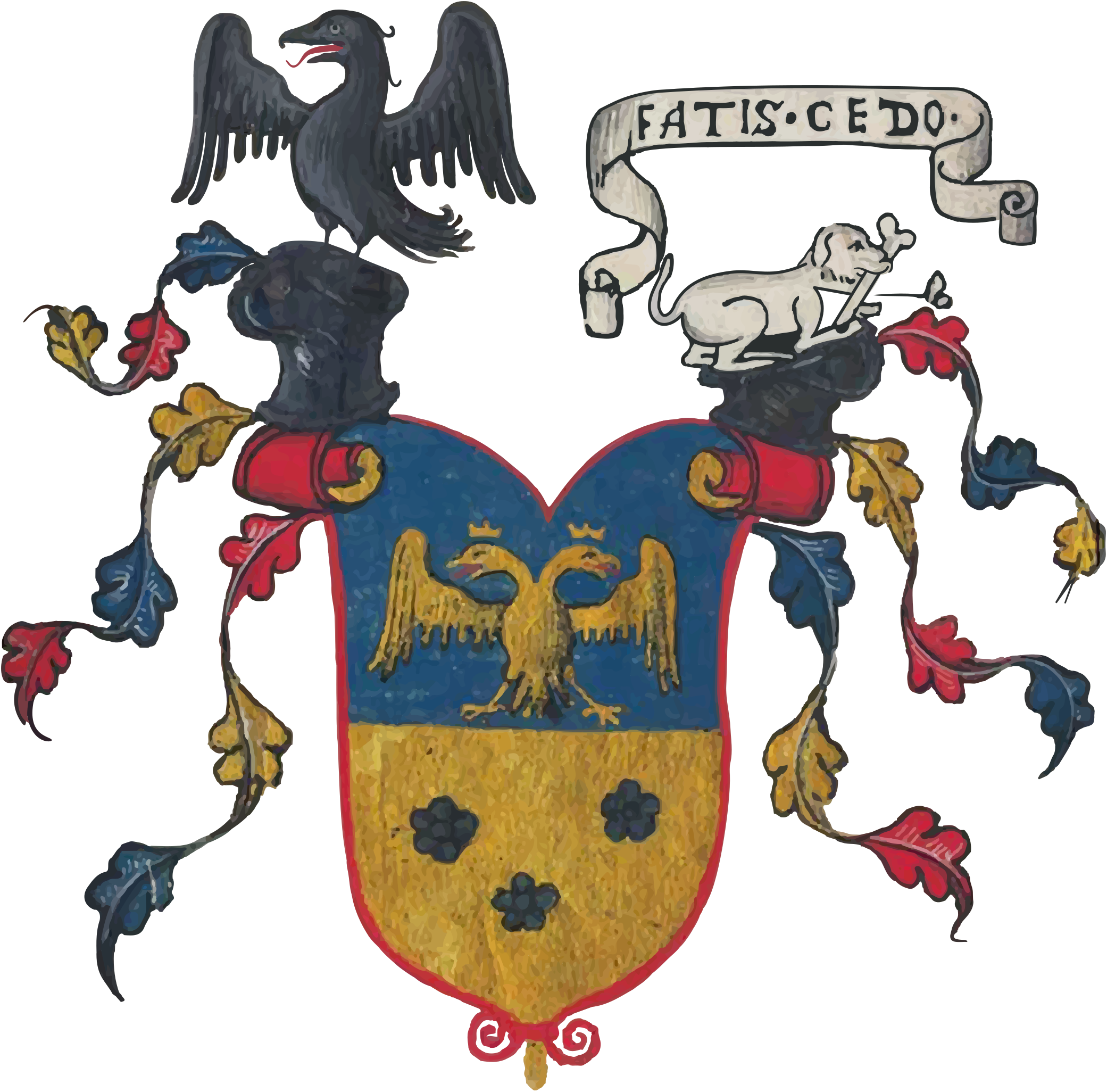
- Illustration of the Statutes of Scutari

Information
- Region: Venetian Albania
- Note(s): The original document is written on parchment and contains 40 pages; at the top it represents the coat of arms of the city, reproduced here: above the double-headed eagle, on the left is seen a proud vulture, which seems to symbolize the affluent past of the city, while on the right a begging dog seems pleased with the receiving bone, which from scholarly opinion, metaphorizes the subjugated state of Scutari after the Ottoman conquest.

The Statutes of Scutari or Statutes of Shkodër (Albanian: Statutet e Shkodrës; Italian: Statuti di Scutari) were the highest form of expression of the self-government of the Albanian town of Scutari (Shkodër) during Venetian rule. There were other cities in Albania which had statutes but only those of Scutari are preserved in their fullest form. They are composed of 279 chapters written in the Venetian language of the 15th century. They were held in two copies, one in the treasury office of the city and the other on the city court office. Although similar to other Italian and Dalmatian city statutes, they have incorporated many Albanian traditional elements and institutions, such as Besa and Gjakmarrja, developing their own legal traditions through a codification of local customary laws.

The original document is a parchment consisting of 40 pages, hand-copied by a certain Marino Dulcic in the 15th century. Its existence was mentioned in an Italian bibliography in 1907, but the content itself was only widely published in 1997, when it was found in the archives of the Museo Correr in Venice by historian Lucia Nadin.

== History ==
According to Oliver Schmitt, the Statutes in their current form date to the early 14th century. Historian Pëllumb Xhufi considers them an accurate record of life in Shkodër from 1330 until the Ottoman conquest in 1479.

The consensus of Nadin, Schmitt, Giovan Battista Pellegrini, and Gherardo Ortalli is that the Statutes were drafted and implemented before Stefan Dušan’s conquest of Shkodër and remained in force with the Venetian conquest. Although the population of the city was at first mainly Dalmatian Italian, the Black Death devastated the city in 1348 and drove Albanian and Slavic immigration to the area.

== Content ==
Similar legal codes were written in 1369 in Bar, in 1379 in Ulcinj, in 1392 in Durrës, and in 1397 in Drisht. They have not all been preserved, however, and efforts to find them were stymied until the Shkodër example’s discovery.

279 ordinances regulated the life of the city, including government, construction, handicrafts, agriculture (both crops and livestock), trade, lawsuits, family law, citizenship, etc. Violators were fined and the proceeds split between the zupan (count representing the King of Serbia) and either the municipality or the aggrieved party, depending on the nature of the offense.

Schmitt classifies them into sections, such as chapters 1-7 on relations between King and subject, or chapters 8-50 on relations between neighbors and land division. Other sections focus on citizen qualifications for the popular assembly, the council, the courts, city posts, military service, property obligations, criminal sanctions, etc.

=== Language ===
The Statutes were implemented in Latin from 1346 to 1479, which was common at the time on the Adriatic coast. The chapter titles are in Venetian, but the text uses the Dalmatian language, a local dialect, typifying the culture of the Balkan coasts at the time of the 14th-century Stato da Màr. Pellegrini, who analyzed the phonetics, syntax, and vocabulary, notes the language’s labialization.

According to Ardian Klosi and Ardian Vehbiu, the only trace of the Albanian language found here is the word besare, referring to the local concept of besa (“oath”). Gjakmarrja (blood feuds) are referred to as urazhba, a Serbian word, interpreted by Xhufi as evidence for Milan Šufflay’s assertion that “Albanians borrowed from neighboring Slavs the concept of the blood feud after coming into contact at some point beyond the 8th century.” The word pazia, for stupidity, may share a similar origin.

The use of latino as interchangeable with cittadino implied a difference from slavi, albanesi, and forestieri, for instance, as terms for foreigners. This shows a concept of civic identity in which Slavs and Albanians were viewed as foreign.

== Publication ==
The Statutes were first republished in Italy in 2002, both the original Venetian and a modern Albanian translation by Xhufi. Xhufi heavily altered the original, changing “Slavs and Albanians” in one portion to “farmers and highlanders,” for instance. This was criticized by Vehbiu as a nationalist interpretation.

A second edition in 2010 was more faithful to the original statues, with the copies this time translated by Vjollca Lisi.

== See also ==
- Statutes of Drisht
- Statutes of Durrës
- Albanian cities during the Middle Ages
