= Albanian nobility =

Historic ruling class and landowners in Albania

The Albanian nobility was an ethnic Albanian elite hereditary ruling class in Albania, parts of the western Balkans and later in parts of the Ottoman world. The Albanian nobility was composed of landowners of vast areas, often in allegiance to states like the Byzantine Empire, various Serbian states, the Republic of Venice, the Ottoman Empire and the Kingdom of Naples in addition to the Albanian principalities. They often used Byzantine, Latin or Slavic titles, such as sebastokrator, despot, dux, conte and župan. Notably, they also constructed religious sites, castles and had powerful courts. The Albanian principalities were usually divided in history except during the Principality of Arbanon when there was only one Albanian state ruled by one dynasty, and also during the League of Lezhë where most of the Albanian nobility and peasant communities unified under a military alliance against the Ottoman Empire.

== History ==
Noble Albanian families first arose during the Middle Ages and usually provided allegiance or were vassals to a certain kingdom or empire. They relied on their state’s economically and politically which would often cause for Albanian feudal lords to often convert religions to meet the demands of the state. During the Ottoman period, Albanian landowners would convert to Islam and pay a tribune to the Ottoman sultan to remain in power.

=== Angevin Kingdom of Albania ===
The role of local Albanian lords became more and more important to the fate of the kingdom and the Angevins integrated them into their military structure especially in the second phase of the kingdom. When Philip of Taranto returned in 1304, one Albanian noble, Gulielm Blinishti, was appointed head of Angevin army in the Kingdom of Albania with the title marascallum regnie Albaniae. He was succeeded in 1318 by Andrea I Muzaka. From 1304 on, other western titles of nobility were bestowed by the Angevins upon the local Albanian lords. Although the Angevins tried to install a centralized state apparatus, they left great autonomy to the Albanians cities. In fact, in 1272 it was Charles of Anjou himself who recognized the old privileges of Durrës' community. Eventually, the Angevins lost most of their power within Albania and were left with the Duchy of Durrazzo, which some Albanian nobles managed to keep their titles. Although, this would not last for long as Albanian ruler Karl Thopia would eventually become the ruler of the city after the end of the Albanian-Anjou Conflict, being later succeeded by his son Gjergj Thopia.

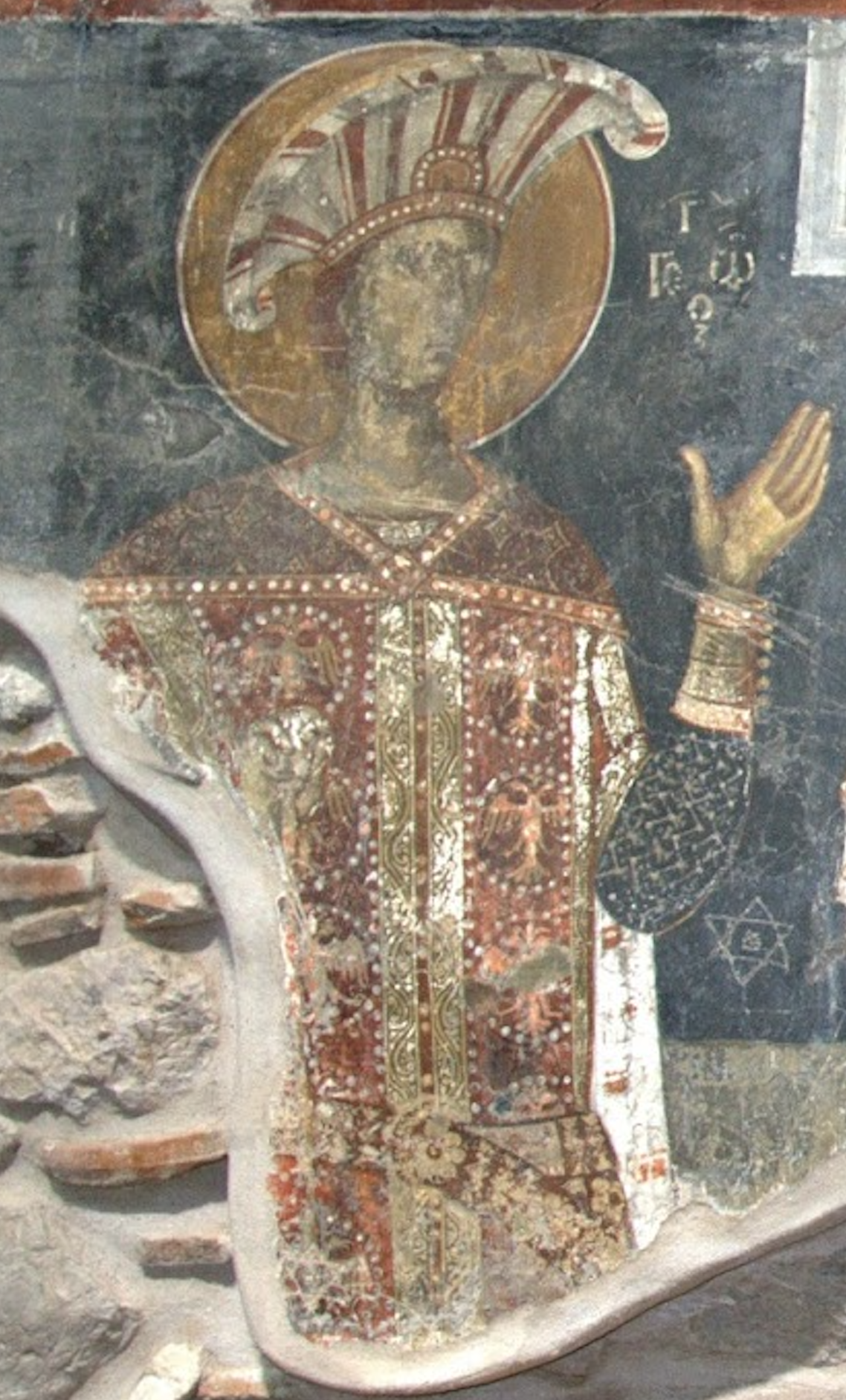
Fresco thought to be Andrea II Muzaka from the Church of St. Athanasius of Mouzaki. His coat of arms awarded by the Byzantine emperor is present on the fresco.

=== Byzantine Empire ===
Byzantium was the first empire in history to have allowed Albanian nobility the privileges of Albanian landowners governing lands. The Muzaka family is an example of this and were loyal to the Byzantine Empire. During the Muzaka-Serbian Conflict they had protected the empire from the Serbian king Vukašin and had even managed to capture the king himself at the battle of Pelister which is in what is now modern day North Macedonia. For their great victory, the head of the family Andrea II Muzaka gained the title of Despot in 1335, while other family members of the Muzaka continued to pursue careers in Byzantine administration in Constantinople. They received impressive titles in the Byzantine empire such as Sebastokrator, Protosebastos. Other families such as the Mataranga family also gained similar titles and were vassals to the Byzantine empire. There were also numerous notable figures such as David Arianites, who was thought to have been from the noble Albanian Arianiti family, and Progonos Sgouros who carried significant Byzantine military titles and also governed lands within the empire.

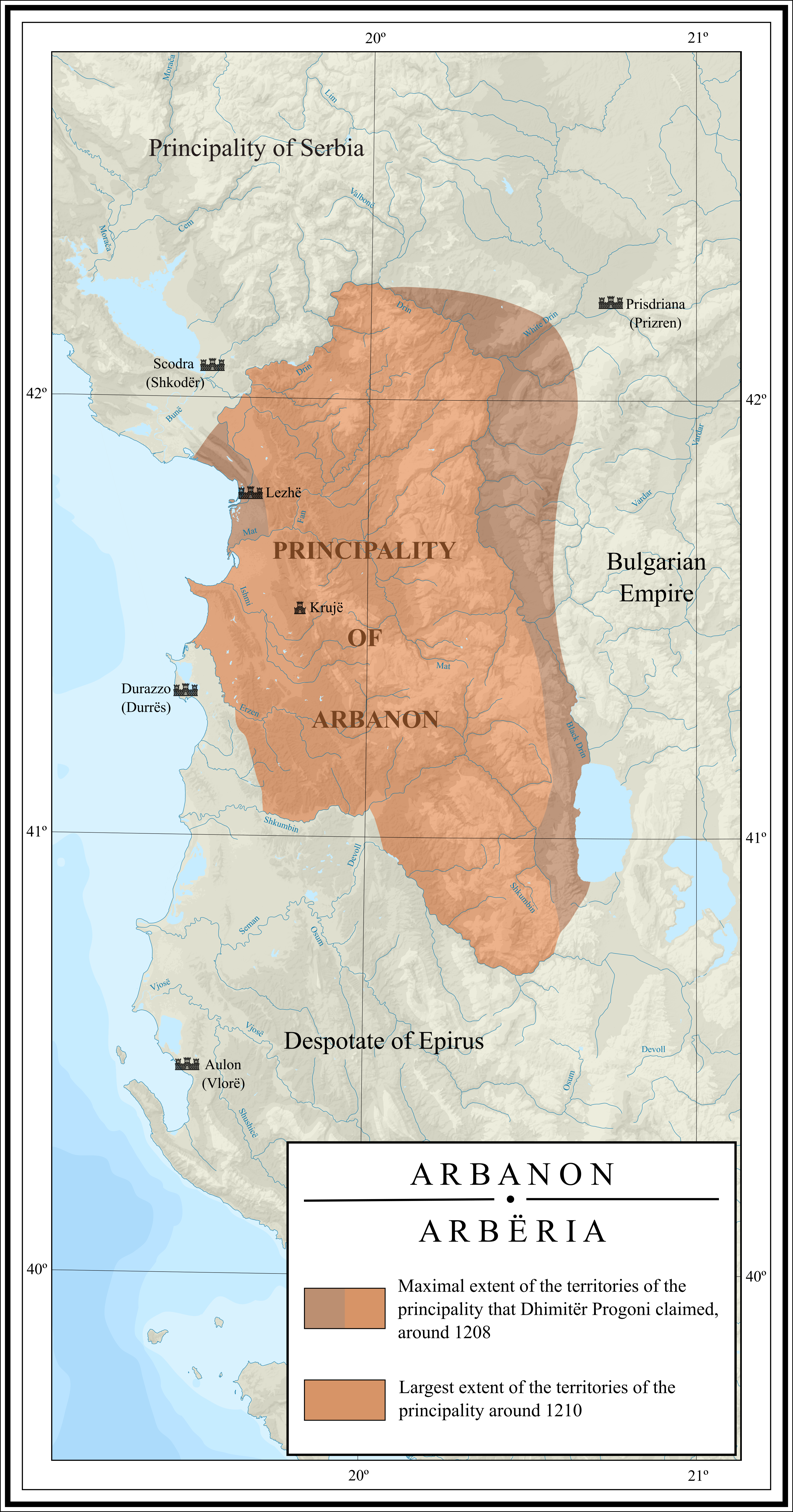
Map of Arbanon at its largest extent.

=== Principality of Arbanon ===
The first Albanian state in the Middle Ages, it was ruled by the noble Albanian Progoni family and extended from the Drin river to the southern boundary of the Ohrid lake. Its rulers were known in Catholic sources with the titles of judices, while in Byzantine ones the titles mentioned are those of the grand archon and the panhypersebastos. In 1204, Arbanon attained full, though temporary, political independence, taking advantage of the weakening of Constantinople following its pillage during the Fourth Crusade. However, Arbanon lost its large autonomy ca. 1216, when the ruler of Epirus, Michael I Komnenos Doukas, started an invasion northward into Albania and Macedonia, taking Kruja and ending the independence of the principality. During this period, the area was ruled by the Greco-Albanian lord Gregorios Kamonas, the new spouse of Demetrius' Serbian former wife Komnena Nemanjić, and by Golem (Gulam), a local magnate who had married Kamonas' and Komnena's daughter. Arbanon was eventually annexed in the winter of 1256–57 by the Byzantine statesman George Akropolites. Golem subsequently disappeared from historical records. Akropolites' historical writings are the main primary source for late Arbanon and its history. Many scholars note that the Principality of Arbanon was the first Albanian state to emerge during the Middle Ages. Arbanon is generally considered to have retained large autonomy until Demetrius death in 1216, when the principality fell under the vassalage of Epirus or the Laskarids of Nicaea.

Between 1190 and 1204, Arbanon was a principality of the Byzantine Empire and possessed a considerable degree of autonomy, although the titles 'archon' (held by Progon) and 'panhypersebastos' (held by Dhimitër) are evident signs of Byzantine dependence. In the context of a weakening of Byzantine power in the region following the sack of Constantinople in 1204, Arbanon attained full autonomy for 12 years until the death of Demetrios in 1215 or 1216.

=== Serbia ===
When Durrës was captured by the Kingdom of Serbia, Milutin was titled the King of Albania while his rule was occasionally recognized by Albanian noblemen around Durrës. Many Albanian noblemen were included in the feudal hierarchy of the Kingdom of Serbia and had titles and privileges of župans, voivodas or kaznacs. Albanian nobility was included into hierarchy of the feudal system of Serbian Empire without any discrimination and participated in the work of the highest government institutions, where Albanian archons had the same rights as the Serbian nobility had. Serbian emperor wanted to gain the support of the Albanian nobility so he confirmed the privileges Kruje had been granted by the Byzantine Empire.

=== Ottoman Empire ===
A decisive point of the relation of Albanian nobility with Ottoman Empire was the Battle of Savra in 1385. After the Battle of Savra Albanian nobility became vassals of the Ottoman Empire.

Albanian nobility did not fight against Ottomans with united and compact forces like Serbian and Bulgarian aristocracy, but with small independent local rulers. Therefore, the Ottomans, who have been since claimed to be "brutal and cruel" to the Serbian and Bulgarian nobility, might have been conciliatory with the Albanian nobility.

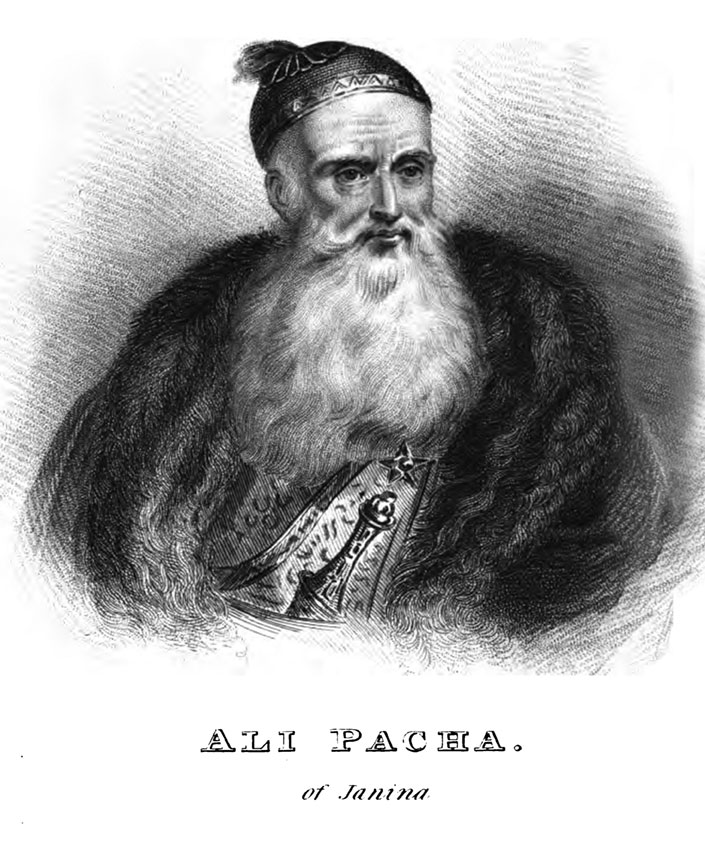
Ali Pasha of Yanina, a prominent Albanian noble and Pasha.

Kara Mahmud Pasha ruler of the Pashalik of Scutari the most prominent figure of the Bushati family.

When Albania became part of the Ottoman Empire, it was divided into sanjaks with numerous timars. Many members of the Albanian nobility held high rank positions within Ottoman the hierarchy, like Skanderbeg and Ballaban Badera who were Ottoman sanjakbeys. Some members of the Albanian nobility were Ottoman timariots. Through the implementation of the timar system the Albanian nobility was absorbed into the Ottoman military class within not more than two generations. They adopted the Ottoman titles such as agha, bey or pasha. However, there was also a significant amount of resistance to Ottoman rule from Albanian nobility, as evidenced by the Albanian revolt of 1432–1436 and Skanderbeg's rebellion. During a time period, there were also Albanian Pashaliks which were 3 semi-independent states ruled by Albanian nobles who carried the Ottoman title of Pasha.

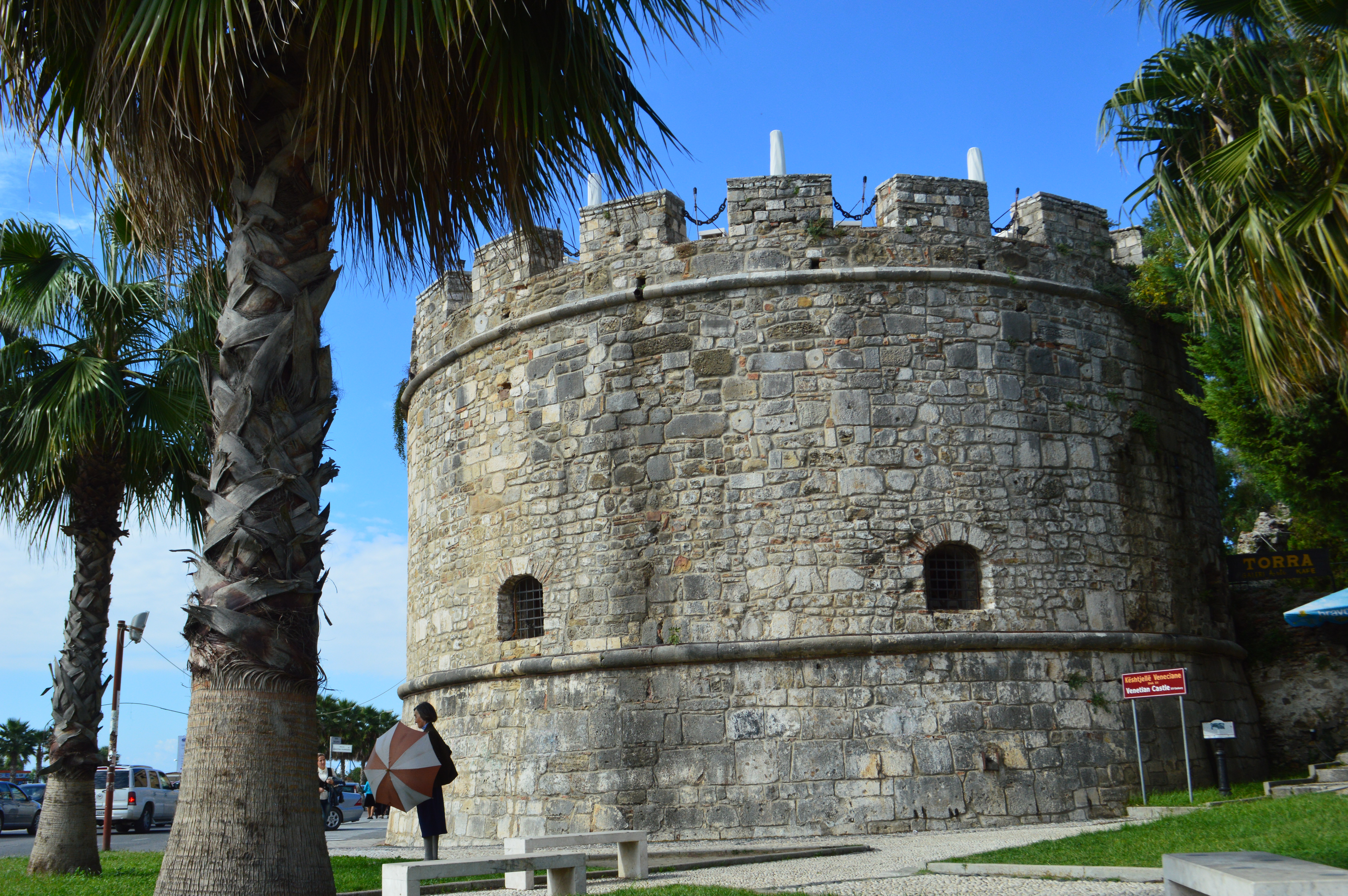
Venetian tower at Durrës Castle in Albania.

=== Republic of Venice ===
During the period of crisis for the Ottoman Empire after the Battle of Ankara in 1402 several Ottoman vassals from Albania including Gjon Kastrioti, Niketas Thopia and Nicola Zaccaria, recognized Venetian suzerainty. Numerous members of Albanian noble families were Venetian pronoiers. Many Albanian noblemen fought against Skanderbeg within Venetian forces during Albanian–Venetian War. The Venetian Duchy of Durazzo was also under control of Venice and many Albanian nobles claimed citizenship rights to the city which is now modern-day Durrës.

=== Kingdom of Naples ===
In 1451, many Albanian noblemen became vassals of the Kingdom of Naples. The first was Skanderbeg who signed the Treaty of Gaeta on March 26, 1451 and after him many other Albanian noblemen like George Arianiti, Ghin Musachi, George Strez Balšić, Peter Spani, Pal Dukagjini, Thopia Musachi, Peter of Himara, Simon Zenebishi and Carlo II Tocco signed similar treaties. Skanderbeg had to fulfill his vassal obligations to send his forces to Italy to support Ferdinand I of Naples in his struggle against the Angevin Dynasty. In return, the Kingdom of Naples provided financial and military support to its vassals in Albania and maintained a permanent garrison in Kruje.

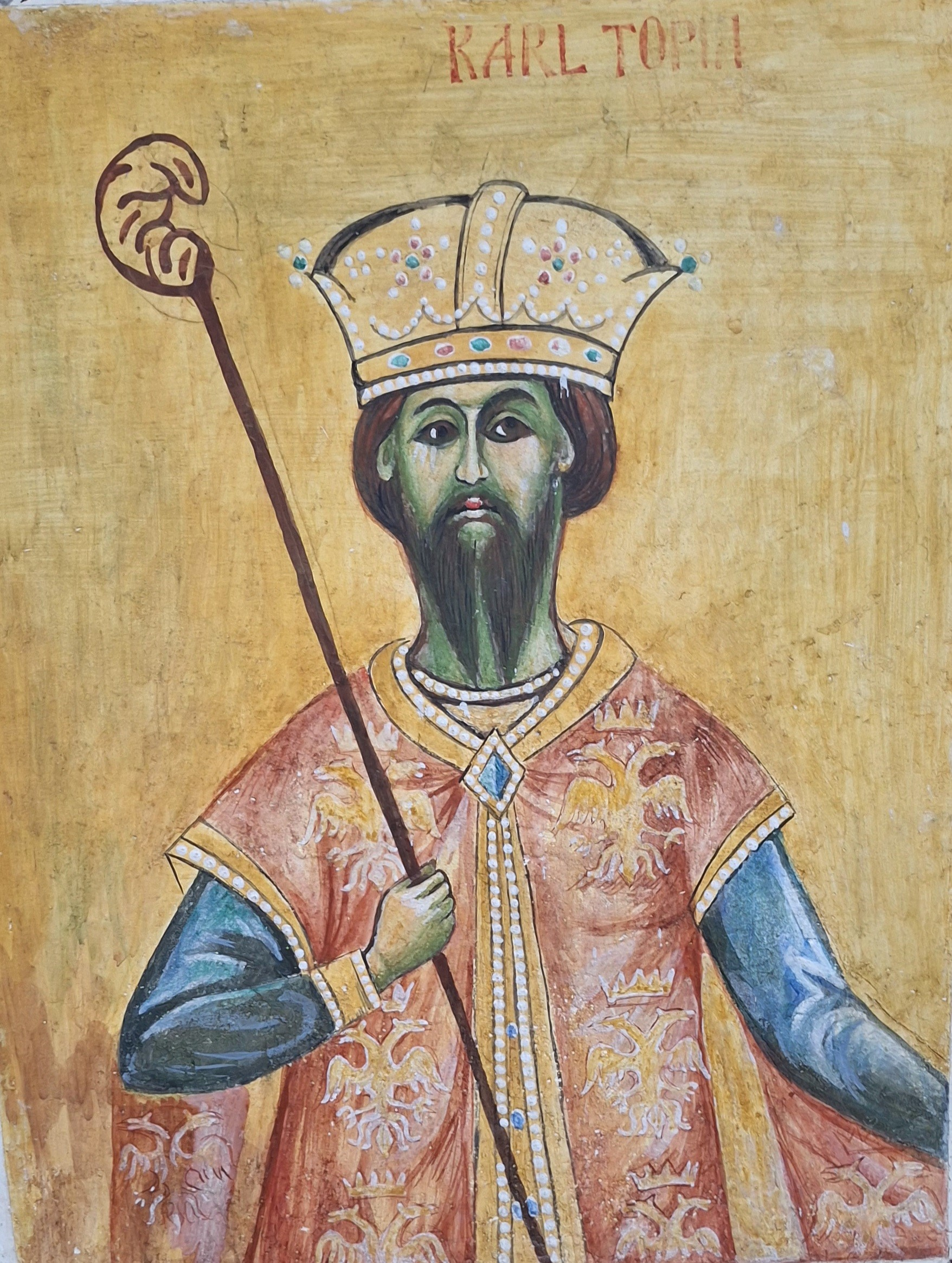
Portrait of Albanian nobleman Karl Thopia, prince of Albania, at the Skanderbeg Museum in Krujë, Albania.

=== Principality of Albania ===
The Principality of Albania was founded by Karl Thopia in 1359 who ruled the lands in central Albania between the rivers of Mat and Shkumbin. The principality was also able to conquer Durazzo from the Anjou who had controlled it at the time. He was later succeeded by his ill son Gjergj Thopia, who married Serbian princess Teodora Branković and had no issue. The remaining lands were split and fought between Helena Thopia and Karl’s illegitimate son Niketa Thopia.

== Religion and language ==
The religion of the Albanian nobility depended on the religion of their lords, or the power that could threaten their political existence. Until the end of 14th century the Albanian nobility were Christians (Orthodox or Catholic). After the Battle of Savra in 1385 most of the local Albanian nobility became vassals of the Ottoman Empire and began converting to Islam. In the end of 17th century the Albanian nobility was majority islamized. The official language of correspondence in the Medieval principalities in Albania controlled by local nobility were Greek, Latin or Slavic.

== Foundations ==
Many constructions and reconstructions of religious buildings and castles or fortresses were built by the Albanian nobility, such as the construction of Kardhiq Castle by Albanian noble John Zenevisi.

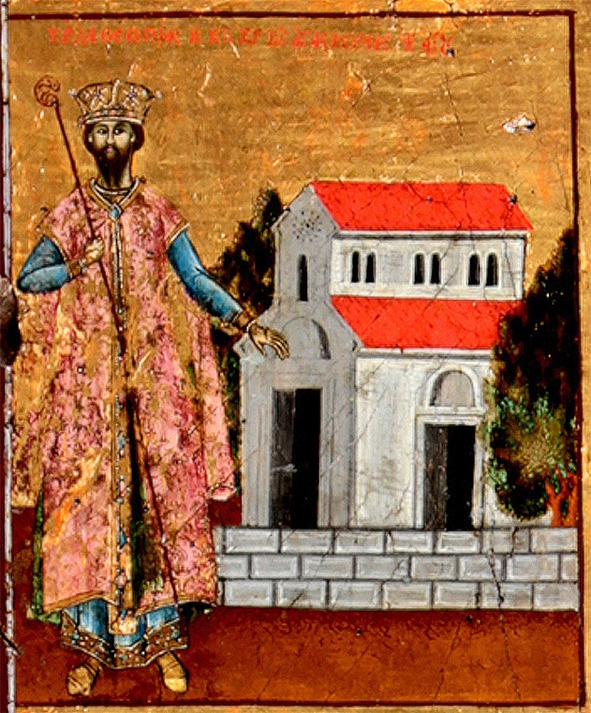
Karl depicted presenting the church dedicated to Jovan Vladimir.

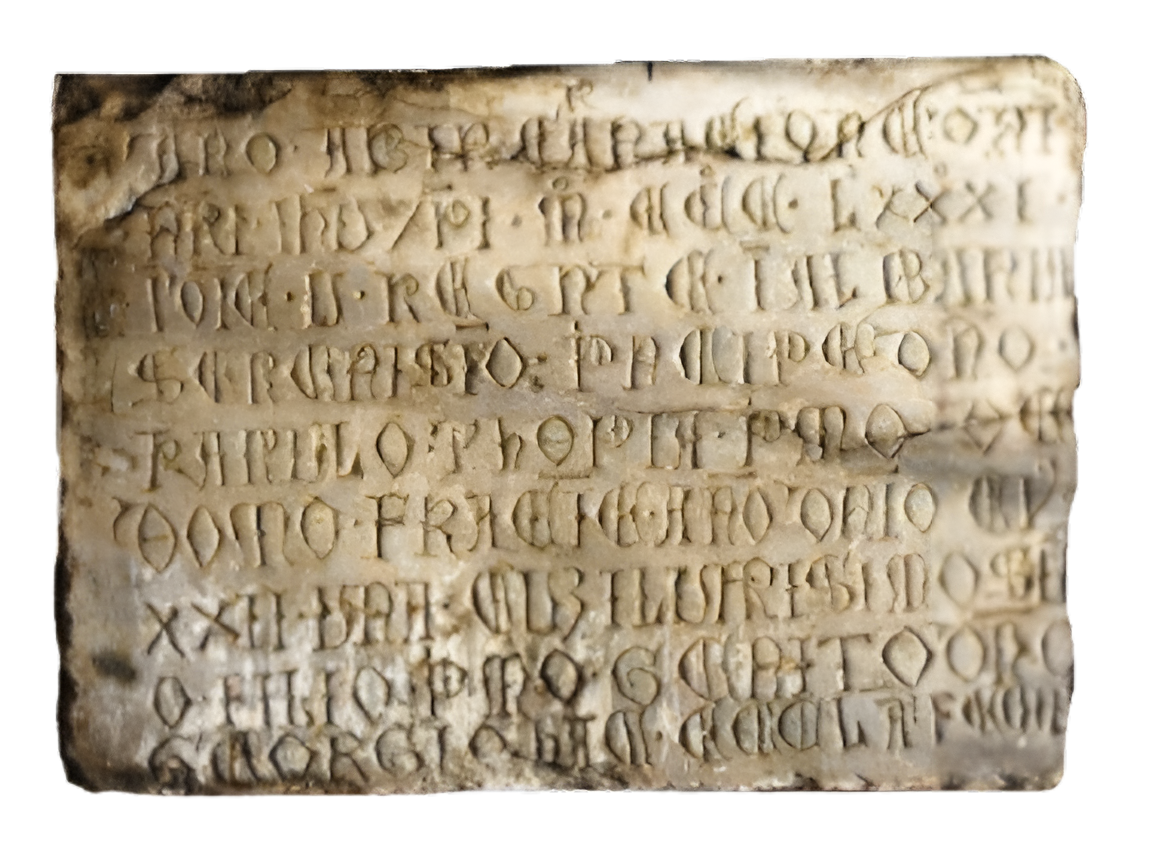
Marble slab found dedicated to Karl and his “most illustrious” son Gjergj at the church.

Religious buildings were also constructed, such as St. Jovan Vladimir's Church in Elbasan, which was constructed by Karl Thopia and held the relics of Serbian Prince, saint and martyr Jovan Vladimir as well as the graves of Karl and his son Gjergj who both ruled the principality of Albania. Another example was part of the church of Saints Clement and Panteleimon was reconstructed and significant donations were made to the church by Karl, and was recognised as a Ktitor who’s coat of arms, almost identical to the one found in Jovan Vladimir’s church in Elbasan, is present.

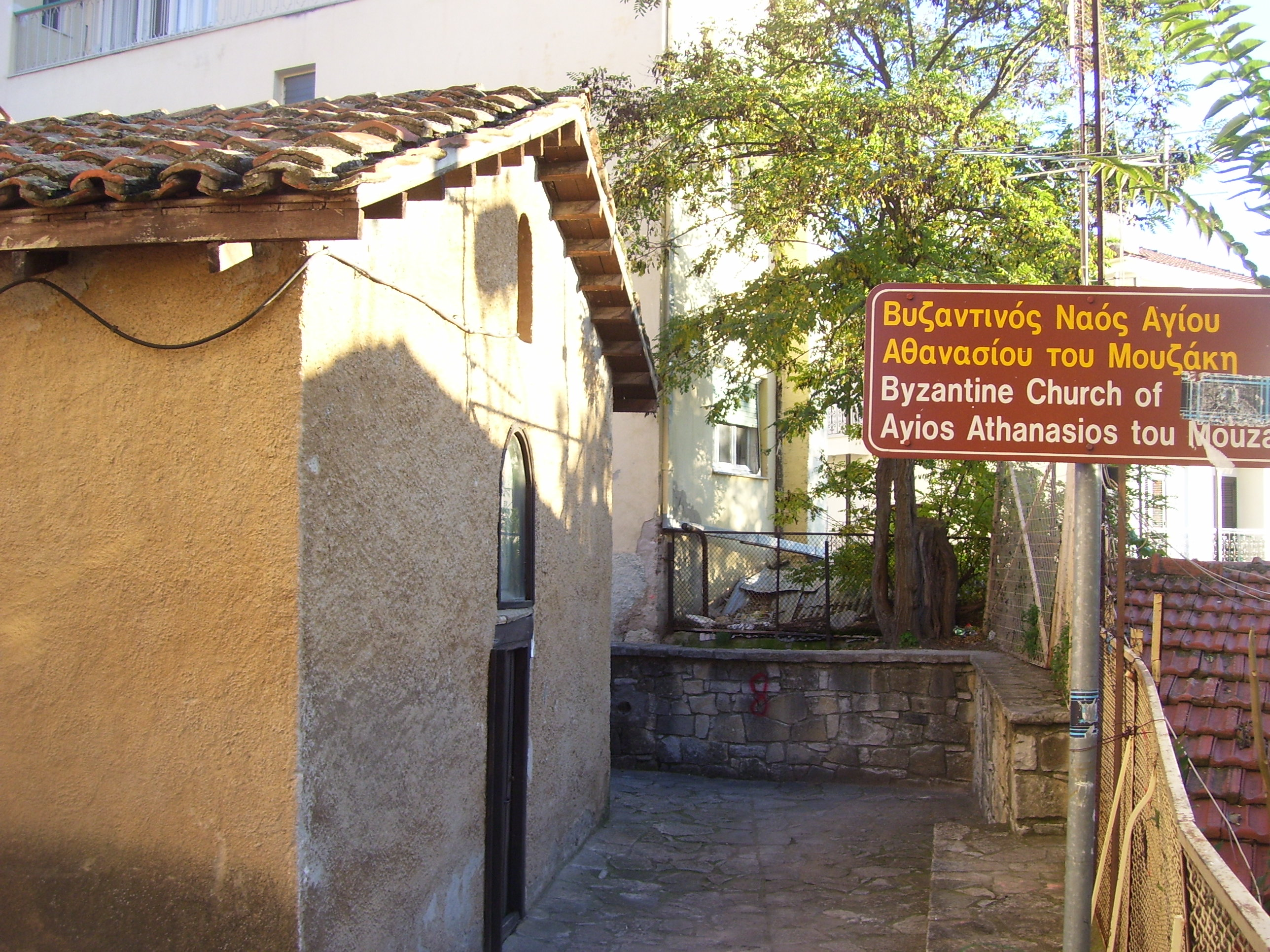
Church of St. Athanasius of Mouzaki in Kastoria constructed by the 2 Muzaka brothers.

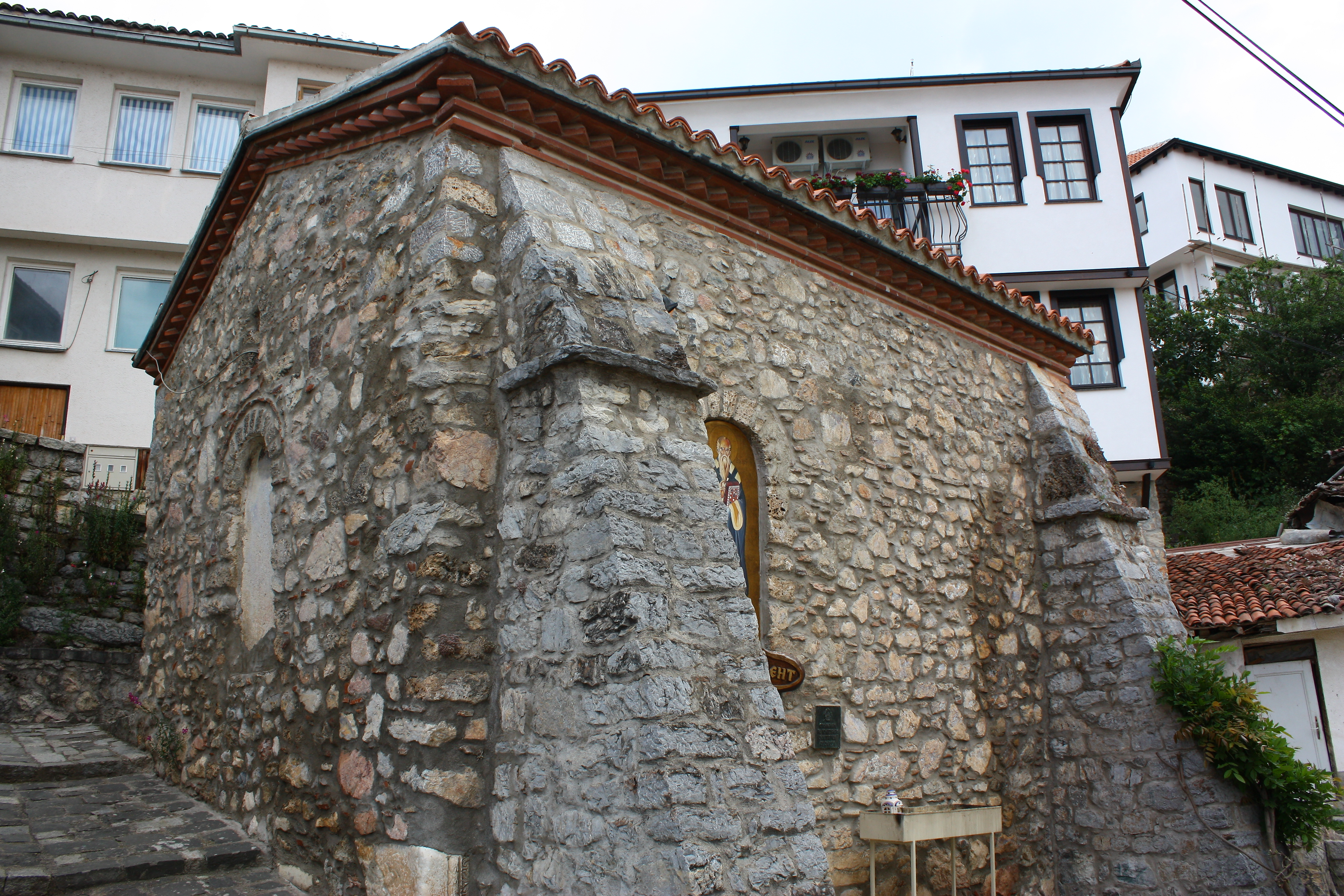
Lesser Saint Celment church in Ohrid constructed by Andrea Gropa.

Another notable religious construction by Albanian nobility was the Church of St. Athanasius of Mouzaki in Kastoria, modern-day Greece. It was constructed by 2 members of the Muzaka family, Stoya Muzaka and Teodor II Muzaka as well as the Greek monk Dionisyius. A fresco of Saint George can also be seen with Byzantine attire and a double headed eagle, similar to the one awarded by Byzantine emperor John V Palaiologos to Andrea II Muzaka. This could be a possible reference or depiction of the noble. Another Albanian noble Andrea Gropa, who was in an alliance with the Muzaka, also constructed a church in Ohrid, thus being mentioned in the founding inscription as a Ktetor.

== Symbols and heraldry ==
The Albanian nobility used a variety of different symbols, coats of arms and heraldry which was usually entitled to them by the state they aligned to. These symbols were often passed down amongst generations.

Gallery
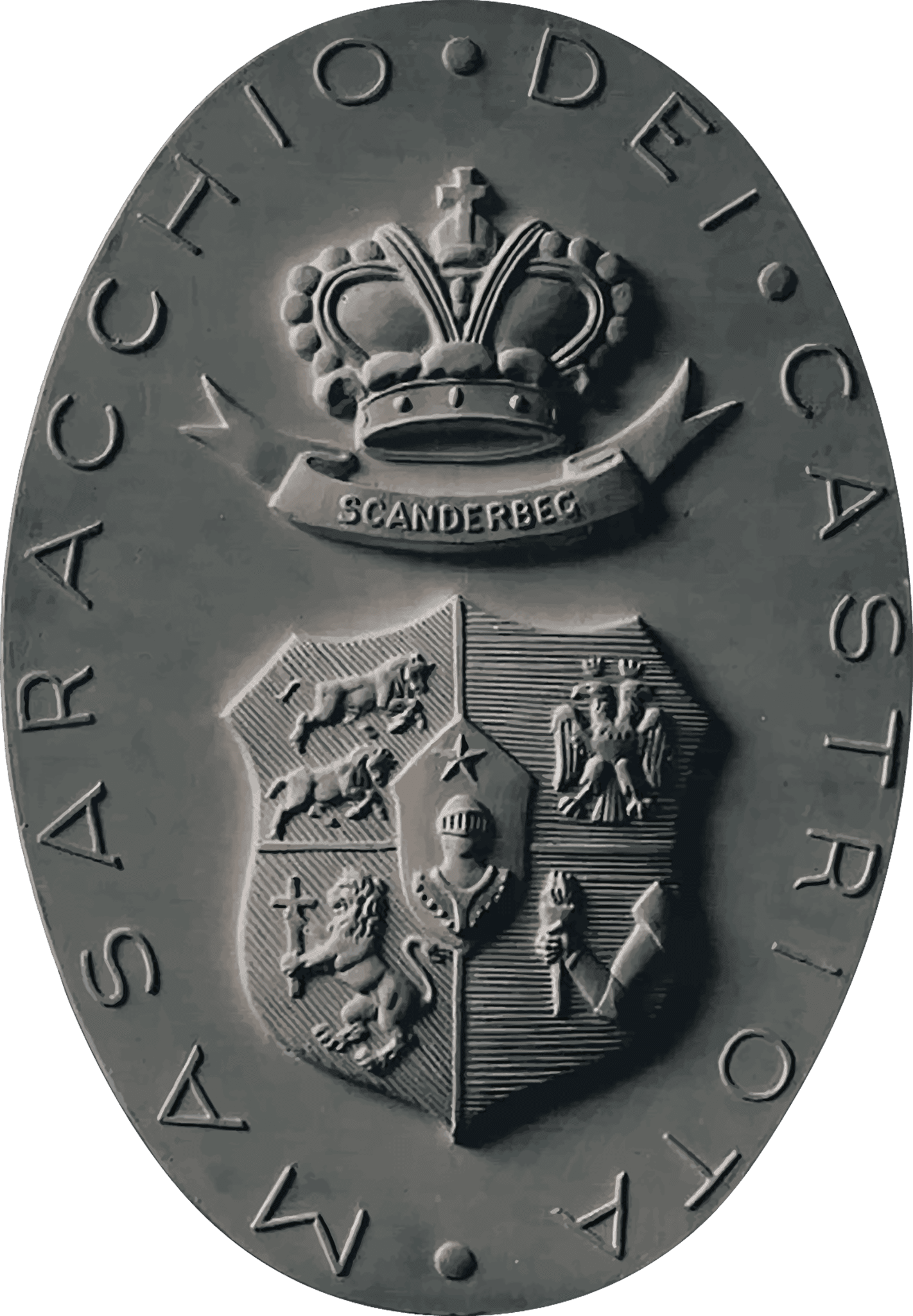
Coat of arms of the Muzaka and Kastrioti family in the 19th-century on the Niscemi palace gate.

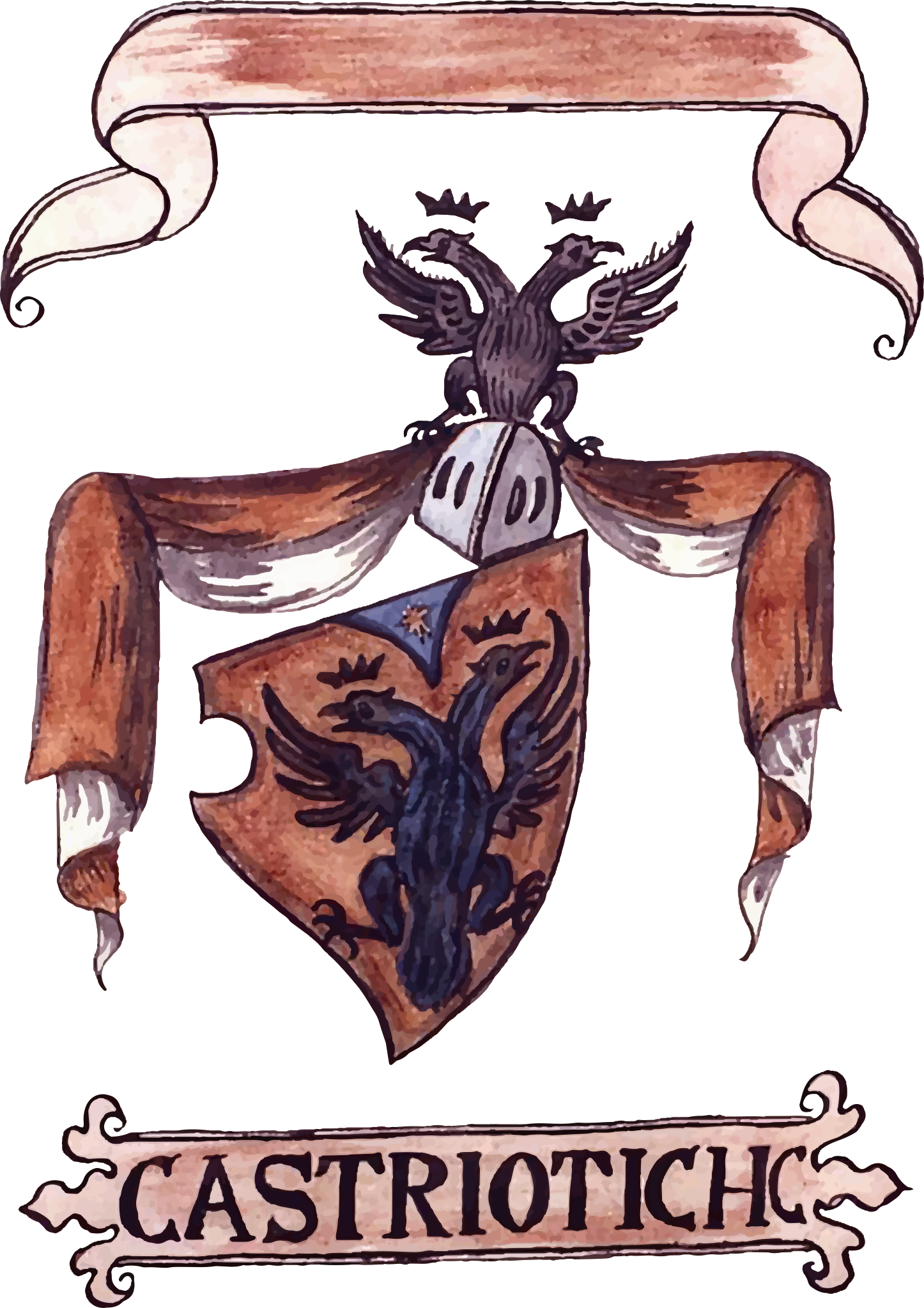
Coat of arms of the Kastrioti at the Fojnica Armorial (1675-1688)

Secret seal of Skanderbeg

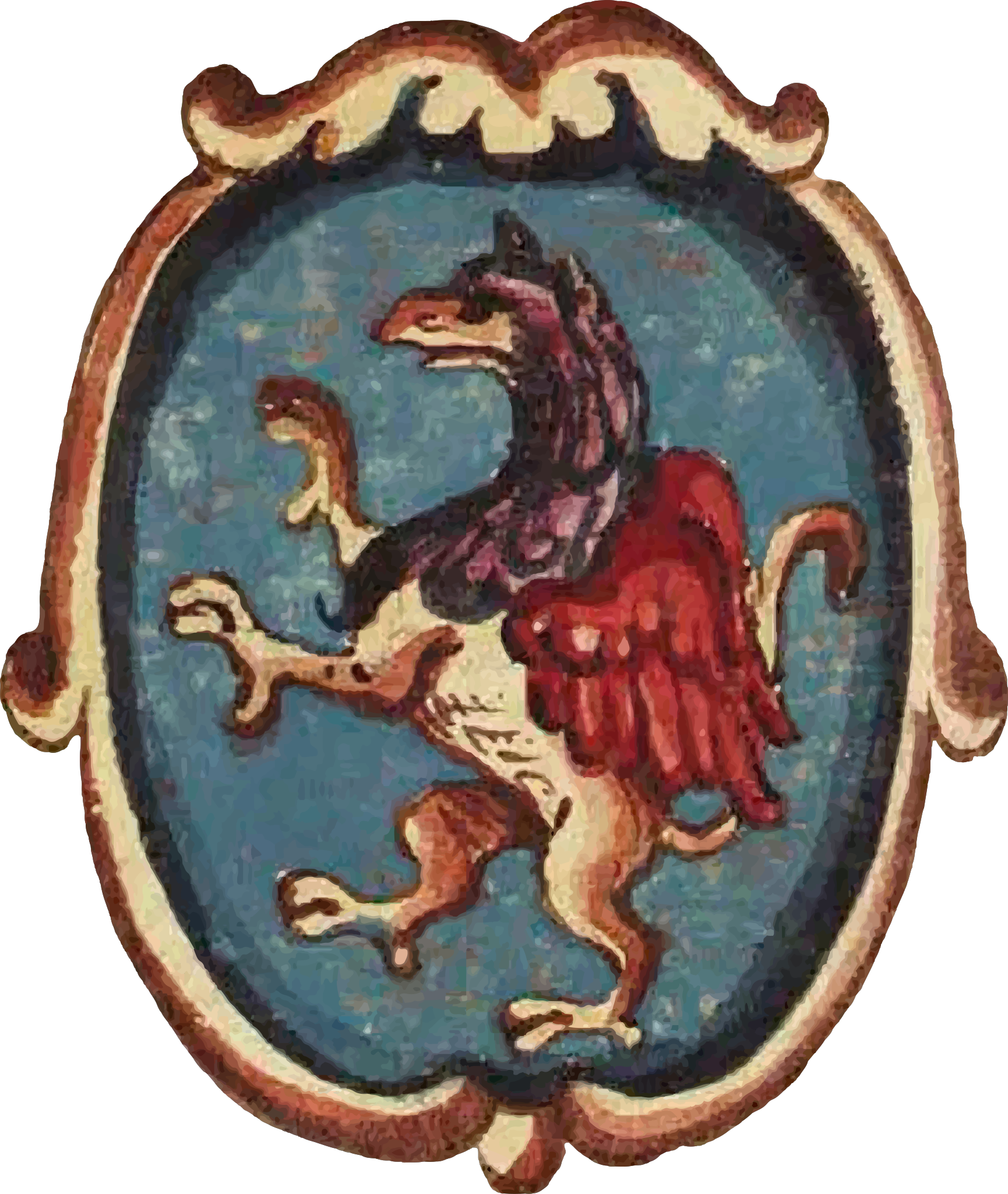
Coat of arms of the Gropa as depicted in 1680.

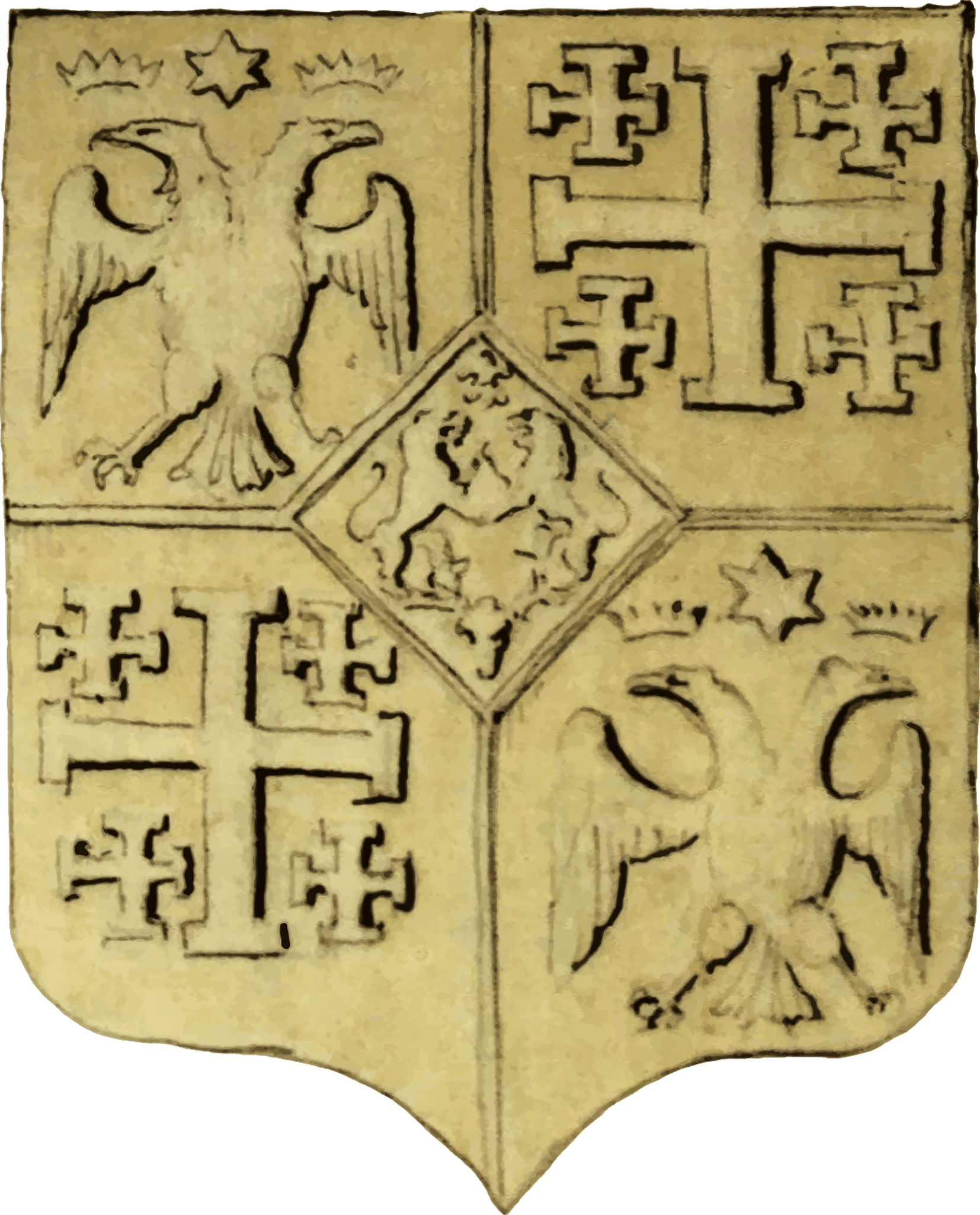
The Coat of arms of Gjon Kastrioti II

== Restoration ==
An attempt to restore the monarchy in 1997 was rejected by about two-thirds of those voting in a referendum. Former noble families and their descendants are still a part of society in Albania, but they no longer retain any specific privileges.

== Noble families ==
This is a list of Albanian noble families, which also includes families that are of Albanian descent.

1. Albani
2. Alibegu
3. Alltuni
4. Angeli
5. Arianiti
6. Arvanitaki
7. Balsa
8. Bitidosi
9. Blinishti
10. Bosdari
11. Bua
12. Burmazi
13. Bushati
14. Bruni
15. Bruti
16. Cocco
17. Crutta
18. Dukagjini
19. Dushmani
20. Durazzo
21. Frashëri
22. Gropa
23. Gjini
24. Ghika
25. Gleđević
26. Humoj
27. Jonima
28. Kastrioti
29. Köprülü
30. Kyrias
31. Losha
32. Lukari
33. Meksi
34. Minotto
35. Mjeda
36. Matranga
37. Moneta
38. Muhammad Ali dynasty
39. Muzaka
40. Niutta
41. Pamalioti
42. Progoni
43. Spani
44. Spata
45. Scura
46. Sorgo
47. Soutzos
48. Taushani
49. Thopia
50. Toptani
51. Vrioni
52. Zaharia
53. Zenevisi
54. Zogu
55. Zaguri
