= Antonio Bruti =

Albanian merchant (c.1518–1571)

- Born: 1518; Lezhë
- Died: 1571 (aged 52–53); Ulqin
- Cause of death: Siege of Ulqin
- Citizenship: Venetian
- Education: Giovanni di lingua, dragoman.
- Occupations: Translator, merchant and diplomat.
- Years active: 1570-1591
- Employer: Venice.
- Known for: Maintaining relations between the Porte and the Western powers
- Spouse: Maria Bruni
- Children: Bartolomeo Bruti, Benedetto Bruti and Jacomo Bruti
- Father: Antonio Bruti (1518-1571)
- Relatives: Antonio Bruni (merchant)
- Family: Bruni family

Antonio Bruti (c. 1518 in Lezhë d. 1571 in Ulqin) was an Albanian trader, agent, merchant and diplomat, part of the Bruti family, who worked for Venice in the cities of Ulqin and Ragusa working with Venetian-Ottoman relations.

== Family background ==
Bruti moved to Ulqin in 1537 fleeing Ottomans. He had three sons; Bartolomeo, Benedetto and Jacomo. Bruti was married to Maria Bruni, of the Bruni family. Brutis brother, Antonio Bruni, was born in the 1550s. His son was Bartolomeo Bruti (1557–1591) who died in Moldavia from strangulation. Antonio Bruti was educated by the Jesuits.

== Career ==
During his career, Bruti bargained with the Ottomans the grain necessary to feed Catholic Venice. The high costs of wheat caused "extreme misery" in the city of Venice forcing the governor of Budva to detain Antonios shipment of wheat. In 1560, Bruti sent a petition to Venice listing the services he had performed. He was Ulqin's most prominent trader of grain. In 1537 Antonio Bruti commanded a military ship and fought for the defence of Ulqin and Bar against the Ottomans. During his time in Ulqin, he tried to shape and form the minds of the local Albanians to join Venice to oppose Ottoman rule In 1570 Antonio Bruti described the walls of Ulqin as "weak and extremely dangerous" According to Venetian historian Andrea Morosini, Antonio Bruti had refused to surrender Ulqin to the Ottomans and fearing hostility, he threw himself in the ocean and was later captured by Ali Muezinzade Pasha. Noel Malcolm believes that Antonio Bruti was on board on war ships in Corfu in July 1570. He died in 1571 when Ottomans sieged Ulqin and killed him.
