= John VIII, Archbishop of Antivari =

Albanian archbishop (1530-1571)

Giovanni Bruni
- Born: c. 1530; Antivari
- Died: 1571 (aged 40–41); Adriatic sea
- Cause of death: Killed by Spanish soldiers who boarded Bruni's ship during the Battle of Lepanto
- Citizenship: Venetian
- Education: Jesuit
- Occupations: Archbishop and priest
- Years active: 1551–1571
- Employer: Venice
- Known for: Archbishop of Bar, lead role in the Council of Trent (1563).
- Father: Gasparo Bruni, the first knight of Malta
- Relatives: Antonio Bruni (merchant), Bartolomeo Bruti, Benedetto Bruti and Jacomo Bruti
- Family: Bruni family

Archbishop John VIII, also known as Giovanni Bruni (Albanian: Gjon Bruni) (c. 1530 - 7 October 1571) served as an archbishop of Antivari in the mid-16th century.

Originally from Ulcinj (present-day Montenegro), from the Albanian Bruni family. He was related to Antonio Bruni and Gasparo Bruni. Pope Julius II appointed John as Archbishop of Antivari (Bar) in 1551 because of his rare virtues and executive abilities.

Bruni confronted Ottoman rule and the Greek Orthodox Church, working hard for the Catholic cause. In 1551, he became the bishop of Bar. In 1553, the Pope wrote to Giovanni in Bar and to the bishops of Ulcinj, asking them to investigate the proposed grant of land by the Abbey of St. Nicholas to Antonio Bruti, who had asked for the papal confirmation to secure the family heir. In 1558, Giovanni became the archbishop of Ulcinj. Giovanni Bruni was a Jesuit and archbishop who took a lead role in 1563 at the Council of Trent, which launched the Catholic Counter-Reformation. Giovanni was enslaved by the Ottomans when the city fell in 1571 and was later killed by the Spanish as they cut him down despite yelling ”I am Christian, I am a bishop”. It is believed that Giovannis brother, Antonio Bruni, was only 100 yards away.

Bruni participated in the Council of Trent between 1551 and 1552, and between 1562 and 1563, at which sessions he spoke with distinction. He was the fiercest opponent of the surrender of the city of Bar to the Turks. However, the Venetian governor of Bar, Count Alessandro Donato, and the Venetian military commander Giovanni Guidaccioni, decided that surrender was unavoidable. One source claims that they had sent the Archbishop and 600 soldiers on a galley to Ali Pasha (Ali Müezzinzade Pasha), the admiral of the besieging Ottoman fleet, who offered to purchase the Archbishop for 25,000 Venetian sequins; but any such offer was never finalised. Like many other people from Bar and Ulcinj, whom the Ottoman forces had captured when those cities fell to their attacks and were surrendered to them in August 1571, the Archbishop was one of the slaves who rowed in an Ottoman galley at the Battle of Lepanto on 7 October.

In 1571, Donato, the governor of Antivari, ceded the town to Turkish control. After alleged violations of the ceasefire agreement, John VIII and many residents urged the governor to resist the Turkish occupation. Instead, Ali Pasha took John VIII as a captive and executed him on 7 October 1571, after the Battle of Lepanto.
