= St. Stephen's Church, Blinisht =

Ruined medieval Catholic church in Blinisht, Albania

St. Stephen's Church
- Church of Saint Stephen
- Albanian: Kisha e Shën Stefanit; Kisha e Shën Shtjefnit
- Location within Albania
- St. Stephen's Church
- 41.86854°N 19.61477°E
- Location: Blinisht, Lezhë County
- Country: Albania
- Denomination: Roman Catholic
- Tradition: Latin

History
- Status: Parish Church
- Founded: 13th century
- Founder: Vlado Blinishti (traditional)
- Dedication: Saint Stephen

Architecture
- Functional status: Ruined
- Architectural type: Parish church
- Style: Medieval (Romanesque-Gothic)

Specifications
- Materials: Stone

Administration
- Province: Ecclesiastical province of Shkodër-Pult
- Archdiocese: Archdiocese of Shkodër-Pult
- Diocese: Diocese of Sapë
- Parish: Blinisht

Cultural Monument of Albania
- Official name: Rrënojat e Kishës së Shën Stefanit, Blinisht
- Type: Cultural
- Criteria: I
- Designated: 5 November 1984
- Reference no.: nr. 786/1

St. Stephen's Church (Albanian: Kisha e Shën Stefanit or Kisha e Shën Shtjefnit) is a ruined Catholic church in Blinisht, Lezhë County, Albania. It stands near the Drin River, close to the former village site and cemetery, and has been designated as a Cultural Monument of Albania.

== History ==
=== Origins and medieval construction ===
St. Stephen's Church is located within the cemetery of Blinisht, near the Drin River. Accounts of the church generally date the origins to the 13th century, during the period of Angevin influence in Albania. One account attributes the construction of the church to Count Vlado Blinishti, father of Gulielm Blinishti, a marshal (marascallum regni albanie) of the Kingdom of Albania during the reign of Charles of Anjou. Other sources place the origin of the church slightly earlier, between the late 11th and early 12th centuries.

=== Late medieval period ===
During the late medieval period, the church went through multiple phases of modification and restoration. One source claims that members of the Blinishti family may have maintained a nearby seasonal residence adjacent to the church at the end of the 13th century. An architectural intervention took place in the mid-15th century, when Prince Nikollë Dukagjini reportedly commissioned a major structural transformation. Eight squared stone pilasters were added along the nave walls, supporting a vaulted roof with Gothic style arches, beneath which stood blind arcades built with characteristic shtuf stone.

=== Ottoman period and decline ===
In 1610, the Archbishop of Antivari (Bar) Marino Bizzi visited Zadrima and recorded very detailed information about parish life in Blinisht under Ottoman administration. He described Blinisht as a village of over 200 Christian households, without any permanent Turkish residents, whose inhabitants paid their annual jizya tax to a regional Ottoman official, Mustafa Çelebia. Bizzi noted that St. Stephen's Church served as the shared parish church for the villages of Blinisht and Gjadër, administered by a single chaplain, Dom Primus Izi, who struggled to serve both communities. During his visit, local elders requested a second priest and argued over parish responsibilities, since the people of Blinisht claimed to have provided the vestments, chalices, and liturgical furnishings for the church. Bizzi also observed strong Catholic devotional practices, including Easter processions in which men, women, and children responded in two choirs with "Kyrie eleison, Christe eleison." His report indicates that St. Stephen's remained an active and well organized Catholic parish in the early seventeenth century.

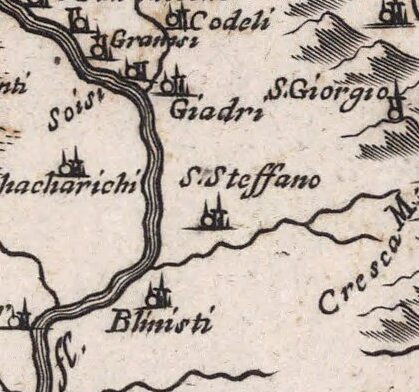
Map of Albania (1689) by Giacomo Cantelli, showing the S. Steffano (Church of St. Stephen), Blinisti (Blinisht), and Giadri (Gjadër).

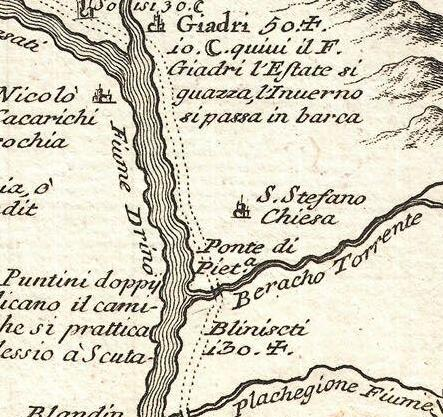
Map of Albania (1690) by Vincenzo Coronelli, showing the S. Stefano Chiesa (Church of St. Stephen), Bliniscti (Blinisht), and Giadri (Gjadër).

In 1641, Bishop of Sapë Frang Bardhi, reporting to the Congregation of Propaganda Fide on the Diocese of Sapa, lists the church of Saint Stephen the Protomartyr as the third parish church of Zadrima. He describes it as lying between the large villages of Blinisht and Gjadër, "both of which," he notes, were built by Lord Nikollë Dukagjini and were laid out according to local custom. The parish church stood on the fertile plain along the Drin and, in Bardhi's words, was "the largest and richest parish not only in Zadrima, but in all Albania," serving around 150 Catholic households (1800 people) in Blinisht and some 70 houses (about 500 souls) in Gjadër. Despite its importance, the church itself was a relatively small, brick-roofed building with a courtyard, able to hold no more than a hundred worshippers, but endowed with three altars, a large gilded silver cross, a silver chalice and two smaller tin chalices, together with vestments and furnishings largely provided by the community. Bardhi notes that three parish priests Dom Pjetër Bardhi (Bianchi), Dom Gjon Milla and Dom Simon Messi resided in a clerical house (monastic cell) at Blinisht with an attached chapel, a garden, and two bell towers which rang every evening for Ave Maria and on feast days. They employed three altar boys to assist with the church and upkeep of the cell. The parish drew income from fields and vineyards (perivole), as well as tithes and bequests, providing the priests with around 200 quarts of wheat, millet and sorghum annually in addition to revenues from their own properties. At the same time, Bardhi remarks that much of this prosperity was eroded by the continual exactions and obligatory hospitality demanded by passing Ottoman officials, and that seasonal flooding of the Drin periodically inundated the houses of Blinisht, forcing villagers, animals, and possessions to retreat to the nearby hills.

In December 1671, the apostolic visitor Pietro Stefano Gaspari passed through Blinisht during his tour of the dioceses of northern Albania. He recorded that the Church of Saint Stephen had stone walls and a wooden altar, but that "over half" of the roof was missing and that about fifteen scudi would be required to repair it. Liturgical life had declined: although there was no immediate threat from Ottoman officials, the Eucharist was no longer celebrated regularly, and the church possessed only modest furnishings, including a rough chasuble, a silver chalice, and a gilded pewter paten. Gaspari noted that the parish owned fifteen stony fields and a small vineyard of sixteen rows, from which the priest produced enough wine for his own use. At this time Blinisht comprised roughly twenty houses and 150 inhabitants, of whom around eighty communicants paid the priest a quart of grain each. Gaspari also listed two dependent villages: "Fandi maggiore" (Fan i Madh), with twenty five houses and a church dedicated to Saint Demetrius, and "Rosa," an eight-house hamlet without a church. Both communities relied on Saint Stephen's for mass, confession, and communion during Lent. The parish priest, Don Andrea Cogna, was described as partly blind and in need of assistance, and Gaspari criticized the lack of catechesis among the local faithful, stating that "ignorance reigns" and many parishioners did not know how to make the sign of the cross.

In 1704, a church report sent to the Holy See in Rome recorded a firman of Sultan Ahmed III granting the community of Blinisht permission to rebuild the ruined Church of Saint Stephen. According to the document, this approval came only after the parish and local community paid a substantial sum, in addition to regularly paying the jizya tax required to maintain their Catholic worship. The source notes that the church had been plundered and burned by Ottoman soldiers at the end of the seventeenth century, a circumstance which had forced the faithful to celebrate mass between two provisional altars serving Blinisht and Gjadër. The same report refers to the destruction, in the same period, of the cathedral church of Shandërtati (Holy Trinity) located in the southern part of old Blinisht. The 1704 firman thus marked a formal authorization to restore and reestablish liturgical life at Saint Stephen's after war related damage.

=== Modern day ===
After the last recorded reconstruction in 1704, the population of old Blinisht gradually abandoned the medieval settlement and relocated to the newer villages of Blinisht and Gjadër.

The ruins of the church were granted official protection as a Cultural Monument of Albania (Category I) by decision of the Ministry of Education and Culture, nr. 786/1, dated 5 November 1984. Despite this designation, the building remains in a deteriorated state.

== Burials and memorials ==
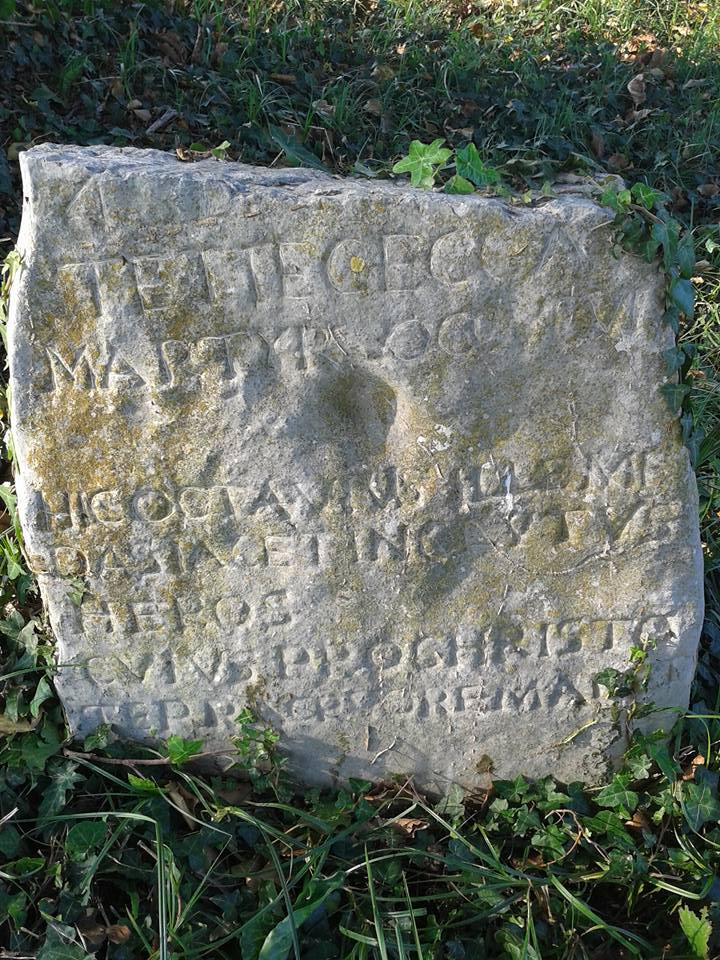
The tombstone of Shtjefën Zeza

A fragmented tombstone preserved at the site is traditionally associated with Shtjefën Zeza also known as Teta i Zi or Tetta Issi, a local Albanian knight and one of the principal leaders of Zadrima at the beginning of the seventeenth century. The stone, inscribed in Latin reads: "You, faithful one, stop a martyr lies here. This is the grave of Teta, whom I see laid out. A famous hero, who lived and shed his blood for the protection of Christ's faith."

Zeza is documented in early modern sources as a participant in the Convention of Dukagjin which was a regional assembly of Albanian chieftains that pledged resistance to Ottoman rule. Archival material published by Injac Zamputi and Luigi Ugolini lists "Tetta Issi" among the signatories of the assembly. He was later killed in battle against Ottoman forces.

== See also ==
- Blinishti family

== Bibliography ==
- Elsie, Robert (2003). Early Albania A Reader of Historical Texts, 11th-17th Centuries. Harrassowitz. ISBN 978-3-447-04783-8.
- Lala, Etleva (2008). Regnum Albaniae, the Papal Curia, and the Western Visions of a Borderline Nobility. Central European University Department of Medieval Studies.
