= Blinisht =

Blinisht is an Albanian toponym which may refer to:

- Blinisht, Lezhë, a village in Lezhë municipality, Lezhë County
- Blinisht, Mirditë, a village in Mirditë municipality, Lezhë County
- Blinisht, Shkodër, a village in Pukë municipality, Shkodër County

== See also ==
- Blinishti family, a noble family in medieval Albania
