= Antonio Bruni =

Antonio Bruni may refer to:

- Antonio Bartolomeo Bruni, Italian violinist, composer and conductor
- Antonio Bruni (merchant), Albanian commander and spy
- Antonio Bruni (poet), Italian poet
