= Vlado Blinishti =

Albanian noble

- Knight, Count
- Issue: Gulielm Blinishti
- House: Blinishti

Vlado Blinishti (fl. 1274–1304) was an Albanian nobleman and the first recorded member of the Blinishti family which held territories across northern Albania during the 13th and 14th centuries.

== Life ==
Vlado is recorded for the first time in an Angevin document of 1274 outlining an agreement made between Charles I of Anjou and members of the Albanian nobility. In the document, Vlado appears with the title of miles (Blado Bletista miles) indicating his position and history as a knight, formerly serving under the Byzantines. Following his alignment with the Angevins, Vlado began establishing political ties with the Kingdom of Serbia and earned the title of kaznac which he held from 1274 to 1304. As a result of Vlado's distancing from the Angevins and a seeming violation of his agreement with Charles I, Vlado was captured and imprisoned by Johannes Scoctus, the captain (miles capitaneus) of Durazzo in 1279 and sent to Brindisi as a prisoner. However, in 1304 Vlado would come to accept Angevin suzerainty once again and was consequently made a vassal by Philip I of Taranto, earning the title of comes and specifically comitatus honore, signifying his position above the other Albanian vassals and lords. In the same year, his son, Gulielm, was elevated to the position of Albania's marshall (marascallum regni albanie). Vlado was also possibly the brother or cousin of Kalojan Blinishti who held the title of comes Regni Albaniae between 1304-19. The Blinishti would disappear from the historical record following their participation in the uprising against the Serbian throne instigated by Pope John XXII between 1319-36.
