= Andrea I Muzaka =

13th century Albanian Lord

- Sevastocrator; Lord of Berat & Myzeqe; Marshal of the Kingdom of Albania
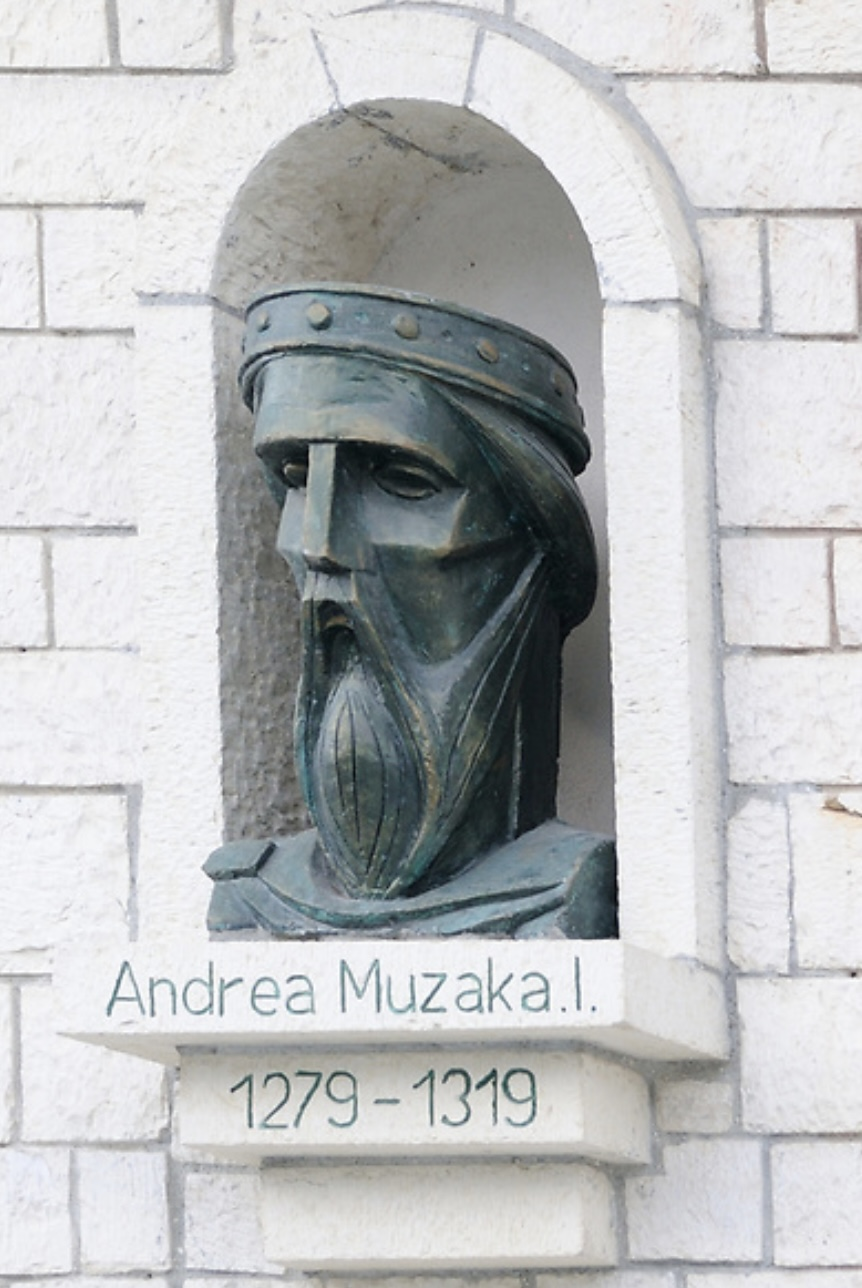
- Bust of Andrea I Muzaka in Berat

Lord of Berat & Myzeqe
- Reign: 1279-1319
- Successor: Teodor I Muzaka

Marshal of Albania
- Predecessor: Jacques de Campagnol
- Successor: Gulielm Blinishti
- Born: Unknown
- Died: 1319
- Spouse: Unknown
- Issue: Teodor I Muzaka; Gjin Muzaka
- Dynasty: Muzaka
- Father: Lal Muzaka

Andrea I Muzaka (Albanian: Andrea Muzaka; 12?? – 1319), also known as Andrew Musachi, was an Albanian Lord and member of the Muzaka family.

== Life ==
Andrea I Muzaka was an influential Albanian lord and the founder of the Muzaka family, which became one of the principal feudal powers in central Albania. While the identities of his parents remain unknown, he emerged as a prominent ruler in medieval Albania, holding significant titles and territorial control. Some sources state that his father was named Lal Muzaka. He held the Byzantine title of Sevastokrator and was the Lord of Berat, as well as ruling over Myzeqe, establishing himself as a key figure in the region. He was appointed the title of Marshal of the Kingdom of Albania (Marescallus regni Albaniae), holding this position from 1280 to 1319. During this time, he was a vassal of the Angevin Kings of Naples, who held suzerainty over the region.

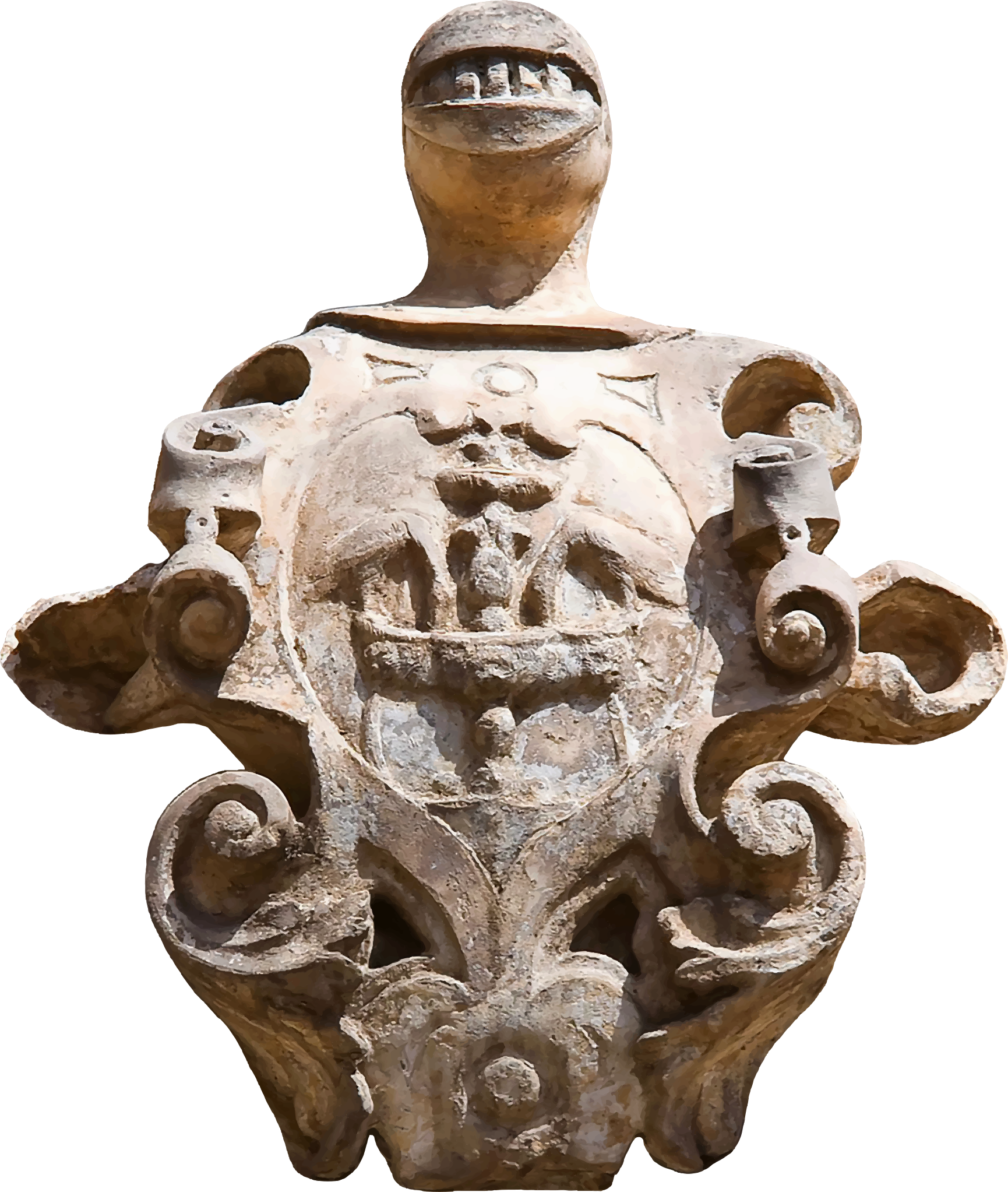
Early coat of arms of the Muzaka family

His domain extended across central Albania, including parts of Devoll, Opar, and Skrapar, with Berat serving as the capital of his rule. His territories also included the region of Myzeqe, with its borders extending from the village of Garunja (Carugua), Gosë (Giossi), Bashtovë (Basti), and Miliota at the Shkumbin River. His control reached down to the river Vjosa and the area known as the Two Stones. Andrea I also ruled over Tomorrica (Tomornica), with its sixty villages, Selenicë (Selenizza), and the town of Korça (Corizza), as well as various surrounding villages and regions.

In 1319, as part of the crusading efforts led by Philip of Taranto, Pope John XXII sent a series of confidential letters to the Albanian nobility. These letters, dated June 17, 1319, were initiated by the Roman Curia and were not publicly circulated. Instead, they were intended solely for the recipients, emphasizing the Albanian nobility's role in resisting the heavy tyranny of the treacherous king of Serbia (grava tyrannis of the rex perfidus Rasciae). The crusade had been prompted by King Milutin of Serbia's persecution of Catholics, which led Pope John XXII to seek support from allies, including Albanian nobles. Among the recipients were Andrea I Muzaka, Marshal of the Kingdom of Albania, and other members of the Muzaka family.

== Family ==
Andrea I Muzaka's wife is not known but the couple had two children:

- Teodor I Muzaka, also known as "Kischetisi" (meaning "long-haired" or "braided"), held the title Protosebastos and inherited all his father's lands. He married the Daughter of Paul of Ohrid and had two children.
- Gjin Muzaka

== See also ==
- Muzaka family
- Principality of Muzaka
- Church of St Athanasius of Mouzaki

== Bibliography ==
- Elsie, Robert (2003). Early Albania A Reader of Historical Texts, 11th-17th Centuries. Harrassowitz. ISBN 978-3-4470-4783-8.
- Fine, John Van Antwerp Jr. (1994) [1987]. The Late Medieval Balkans: A Critical Survey from the Late Twelfth Century to the Ottoman Conquest. Ann Arbor, Michigan: University of Michigan Press. ISBN 0472082604.
- Hopf, Karl (1873). Chroniques greco-romanes inedites ou peu connues [Unpublished or little-known Greco-Roman chronicles] (in French). Weidmann.
- Jacques, Edwin E. (2009). The Albanians: An Ethnic History from Prehistoric Times to the Present - Volume 1. McFarland & Company. ISBN 978-0-8995-0932-7.
- Lala, Etleva (2008). Regnum Albaniae, the Papal Curia, and the Western Visions of a Borderline Nobility. Central European University Department of Medieval Studies.
- Sainty, Guy Stair (2018). The Constantinian Order of Saint George and the Angeli, Farnese and Bourbon families which governed it. Boletín Oficial del Estado. ISBN 978-8-4340-2506-6.
- Tase, Piro (2010). Të Huajt Për Shqipërinë Dhe Shqiptarët [Foreigners for Albania and Albanians] (in Albanian). Lulu. ISBN 978-0-5573-3253-3.
- Živković, Tibor; Kunčer, Dragana (2008). Roger - the forgotten Archbishop of Bar (PDF). Institute of History Belgrade.
