= Frashëri clan =

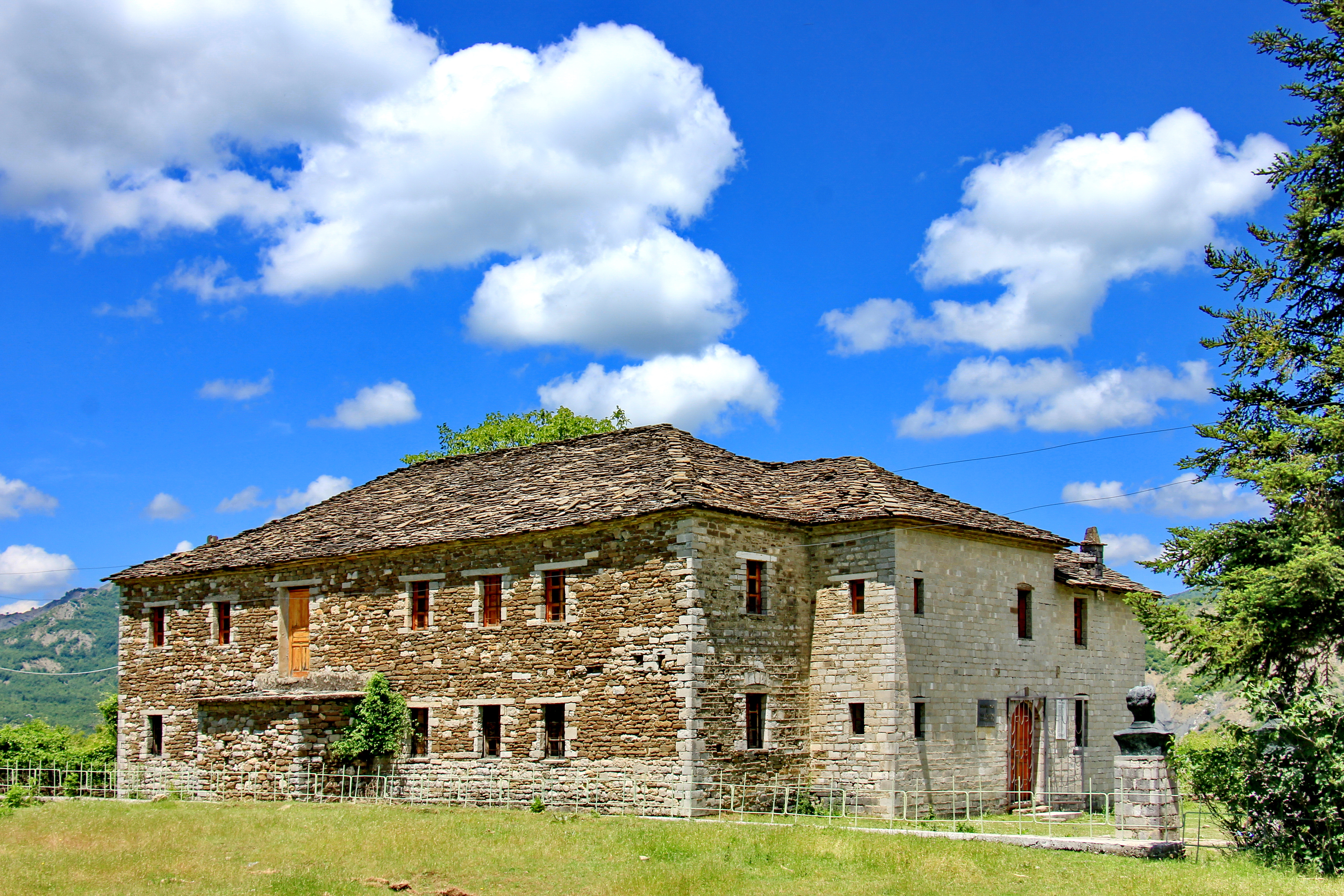
House of Brothers Frashëri, Albania

The village of Frashër in southern Albania saw the emergence of several notable families (Albanian: Frashërllinjtë) in the history of Albania. They contributed to the independence of Albania throughout military actions but also in literature and politics. The most notable of these families are the family to which belonged Naim Frashëri, national poet of Albania.

== History ==
The first documented individual from Frashër was a Petro Frassiari, an Albanian trader in Thessaloniki in 1425. Later documents have information on some members who were stratioti with surname written Frassarët, Frassinët, and Frossinët. They were stratioti from Këlcyrë, a border region with Frashër and Dangëllia. With the allying of Venice, the family joined the Republic of Saint Marku against the Turks, from 1415 to 1563, alongside the families of Bua, Muzaka, Maneshi, Bohali, Barbati, Klada and Kembethekra. The Fresher is one of the 70 Stratiot families. When Venice did not support the Stradiots, Teodor Frasheri became the guard of Saint Mark in 1540. One of this sons, Gjin Frasheri (Zigni Frassinae) was the commander of Sibinik in Dalmatia. In 1564, the descendants of the family, Diana Frasheri Valami (Diana Frassinae). She married the cousin Filark (Voyvoda, head of the brotherhood) in Danglev. There is a high probability that the Fresher family today is a large part of the Dangelliasi, from the Albanian Suliots. Also known as the family of Marko Bocari. The Apostle Stoja of Fresher (est. 1655), one of the last Orthodox rulers of the Tosks, was the initiative of the Fresher family, due to their ties of the Totona, Cokeve-Alickaj and Panollare families. The families of the Sujlemanbelinj of Vilaka, were tied to the family of the Apostol after their Islamization (Alickaj family).

== Families ==
=== The Alicko family ===
One of the branches of the family dates back to the 17th century, with the three sons Ilia, Panajoti and Steani of the Apostle Stoja of Fresher. He was the intendant of the Beg of Ohrid, and the family guarded the church. Ilia, with the help of the Sandzakbey of Vlore, converted to Islam and received rights for the territory of the Fresher family. Ilia changed name to Alia, and from him the family of Alicko-Coku-Frasheri is derived. The Sultan granted Ali the title of Bey. Stefani, the youngest of the family, received the title of secondary bey of the family. The Totoni family (deriving from the name of the son of Stefani, Anton - Toton) remained Orthodox. The Panollare, deriving from Panajoti, remained as the head of the Orthodox family of Fresher and defended their title until 1914.

The family of Alicko derived from Ali Beg, and with the help of the Sultan Ahmet II, the family ended the Christian revolts in southern Albania. One of the grandsons of Ali, Tahir Bega, from Dishnica, married the daughter of Ajaz Begu, named Havanë. The family participated in the uprising of Tomorica and refused to be granted the title of Pasha from the Sultan. The family did however not join the Ali Pasha of Tepelena either. One of the branches of the family decided to move to Butke of Kolonja in the 19th century. From this family, many activists and nationalists derived, such as Sali Butka, Safet Butka, the architect Qemal Butka, the politician Uran Butka, the writer and diplomat Yljet Alicka, the diplomat and professor Albert Alicka, the professor Jetmir Alica, the producer and director Ilia Butka, the engineer Edgar Alicka. The Cokllare family, deriving from Ballkez Frasheri (from the daughter of Tahir Beug), the wife of Abdyl Fresher, who gave birth to Sami Fresher. The family contributed to the National Albanian Awakening during the 19th century. The family supported the Albanian literature movements in Istanbul in 1879.

=== The Panollari family ===
From the second son of the Fresher family, Panajoti (Pano), the family remained as the Orthodox of the Frasheri. and named two villages. Always educated, specially in the village of Zosimea, during the 19th century, the Panots began early with trading in Voskopojë. From them, until the end of the 18th century, the family split, where the Epirot Panos became the great generous family of the Principality of Moldova. The Panollereve family contributed for the Albanian cause in Istanbul. The descendants are Anastase Frasheri, and Gjergj Adhamidhi Beg Frasheri.

=== The Totoni family ===
From the son of the Apostle, Anton Frasheri, the family fought for Albanian independence and helped shape an Albanian national culture. Anastasia of Constantin Totoni-Frasheri was one of the 28 members with influence amongst the Albanians of Istanbul. With Sami Frahseri, they helped write the first letters of the Albanian alphabet in 1879. Anton Frasheris name became canonized in the organization. Anastasia Frasheri II (1890-1958) was the editor in chief and journalist in the organization for Albanian-speaking goals in Istanbul and Romania. Editor at the age of 18 in the newspaper of Mehmet Bey Frasheri, the "Besa" and "The Albanian Calendar". Mithat Beg Fresher was the editor of "Paqes" and "New Albania" and founder of the artistic Albanian group in Istanbul. They were also activists of the Albanian Orthodox Church and prefects of Cameria cause in the government of Fan Noli in 1924. They were also the editors of "Bisedime te Parlamentit Shqiptar" (Discussion at the Albanian government) between the years of 1928-1946. T

=== The Ajaz Beg Tomorica family ===
The descendants of Hamza beg Tomorica (1570), according to Kamus-ul Alamit of Sami FRasheri, the Ajaz bey stayed in Frahseri in the 18th century as a result of an anti-Turkish uprising. In the village, he bonded with Alickaj.

=== The Vila family ===
The family was the branch that became Pashas at the end of the 18th century. Mustafa Ali Pasha of Frasheri, the Spahi of Shipskes, Nikolicë and Voskopoje, the "Prince of Frasheri", derived from Ajaz Beu from the Alicko family and contributed to the Albanian history in secret. They were together with the Albanian beg families, like the Vlora and Libohova. From them came Xhafer Beg Vila (1889-1938), foreign minister of Albania (1933-1935). Rauf Zico, an ex-diplomat in Paris, London, Ankara, Beograd and Rome. Nuri Beg Vila, an Ottoman senior, was the head of the cabin of Turhan Pasha Permeti, the prime minister in 1914. Other members of the family were part of the Albanian dynasty in Egypt with the princess Tossoun.

=== The Sulejmanbelliu family ===
From this branch, Refat Beg Frasheri (1882-1934), bacteriologist Ferit Frasheri, who later was killed in Shkodër in 1924. The actor, and popular artist Nasim Frahseri (1923-1973) was part of the family.

=== Velbellinjtë family ===
The Velibellinjtë contributed through Mehdi Beg Frasheri, a member of the Ottoman Empire, who was the minister of the governmental changes from the 1920s to 1935-1937. King Zog decorated him with the rank of Kordoni with the award of Order of Skanderbeg. Mehdi Beg Frasheri was against the Italian occupation and refused to give away the list of Jews in Albania.

=== The Dakollari or Dulellari family ===
From this family known Albanian figures like Abdyl Frasheri and Naim and Sami Frasheri derived. They contributed to the war of independence of Albania. Abdyl Frasheri with Mehmet Ali Pasha Vrioni and Ymer Prizreni, head of the League of Prizren in 1878-1881. He was a worker who rarely stopped during the Rilindja, and was arrested and persecuted by the Ottomans. In the 1880, he sought to become the prince of Albania. his son, Mithat bey Frasheri, (1880-1849), a patriot and writer during the half of the 19th century, was head of the Ballin Kombetar during World War II, and main rival against the Communist party. Naim Frasheri, the most famous poet and writer of Albania. Sami Frasheri as a philosophy, ideologist and shaper of the Albanian identity.

=== The Pollo family ===
A Suliot family who came to Frasher in 1803, after the devastating attack of Ali Pasha Tepelena. In the 19th century, Stefanaq Pollo derived from the family.

=== The Adhamidhi family ===
A trading family of Frasheri, Gaqo Adhamidhi, or Gjergj Adhamidhi Bey Frasheri (1854-1939) was a doctor in the University of Lausanne, and the personal medics of Khedivit of Egypt (Emperor), thus member of the prince family. He also contributed to the Albanian independence with funds and deeds. He made the Pelasgian identity known to Albanians. He was in conflict with And on Zako Cajupi in the Rilindas. the Prince Vidi became the minister of the finances in 1914. With Prince Wide leaving, Gaqo traveled to Switzerland where he opened a school for Albanians in the diaspora. His son, Bey Paul Adamidi Frahseri, (1904-1989) was one of the founders of the modern art in Switzerland. In the 1970s. he was cambelan of the royal family of Spain. He bonded the families with royal funds in France in 1894. He left behind him many important translations.

=== The Zallari family ===
Another Christian family from the Frasheri was the Zallari, with ties to Totoni, who helped shape the Albanian language in the fight for autocephalousness in the Albanian Orthodox Church. Two names are known, Leonidha and Mihal Zallari. Leonidha Frasheri was the collaborator of Mithat Frasheri in Istanbul with the Albanian press of the time. They were the first to speak Albanian in an organization. The Prefekt of Delvina, Leonidha Frasheri, was the national deputed of 1921. This led to a great patriotic and political activity mentioned in the book of Sejfi Vllamas. Mihal Zallari was one of the intellectuals and publicist in Albania in the 1930s. Opposing the Italian invasion, he became the minister of education during the government of Rexhep Mitrovica and in the regency of Mehdi Bey Frasheri, after the capitulation of 1944. Leonodha became the deputy and Mihal the president of the Albanian organization during World War II. Documents and personal witness testimony in 1944 claim that Mihal Zallari was saved from execution by the Nazis after having broadcast what appears to be communist propaganda in this radio channel Radio-Tirana. Zallari gave away the list of Jews of Albania to the SS-general Neuabcher. With these acts, he was sentenced to 30 years in prison by the Communist regime in 1945.

== Notable members ==
- Dalip Frashëri, 19th-century poet
- Shahin Frashëri, 19th-century poet
- Ali bej Frashëri, organizer of the Anti-Turkish Uprisiings of Tomorica in the 1700s.
- Abdyl Frashëri, founder and head of the League of Prizren in 1878-1881.
- Naim Frashëri, member of the Albanian Society who helped publish the first Albanian letters, also author of the first Albanian books for the first Albanian school in 1887 in Korce.
- Sami Frashëri, founder of the Albanian Society, 1879.
- Anastas I Konstantin Totoni-Frashëri, co-founder of the Organization of Albanian Letters, member of Society of Istanbul.
- Mid'hat Frashëri, member of Society of Istanbul, founder of the organs of the newspaper "the Albanian Calendar" . Also collaborator of the Congress of Manastir in 1908, and one of the persons who signed the Albanian declaration of independence. Also founder of the Ballin Kombetar in 1940.
- Eshref Frashëri, Albanian politician, Chairman of the National Council of Albania from 1922–1923
- Mehdi Frashëri (1872–1963), Albanian politician
- Sali Butka, fighter for the Albanian independence.
- Anastase Frashëri II, one of the founders of the Albanian newspaper "Society of Istanbul" and founder of the Albanian artistic group of Istanbul. He was also the Prefekt of Cameria, legist of the Albanian parliament and also a publicist and writer.
- Gjergj Adhamidhi bej Frashëri (Gjergj Adhamidhi), promoter of the Albanian independence and minister of finances during Prince Widits rule in 1914.
- Ali Sami Yen, founder of the Galatasaray Sports Club
- Meleq Frashëri, military commander and patriot, adjutant for Colonel Thompson në 1914.
- Xhaferr bej Vila, founder of the Albanian diplomacy.
- Safet Butka, teacher and researcher of the Balli Kombetar.
- Leonidha Frashëri, prefect of Delvinë, a delegate in the Congress of Lusnhjë, and co-founder of the "National Shoulder".
- Kristo Frashëri, Albanian historian
- Mihal Zallari, chairman of the assembly of Albania, historian and journalist
- Fehim Zavalani, Albanian journalist
- Stefanaq Pollo, academic, scholar, professor and historian
- Genc Pollo, politician
- Menella Totoni, academic, scholar, professor and linguist
