= Bruni family =

Albanian noble family

Bruni
- Noble family
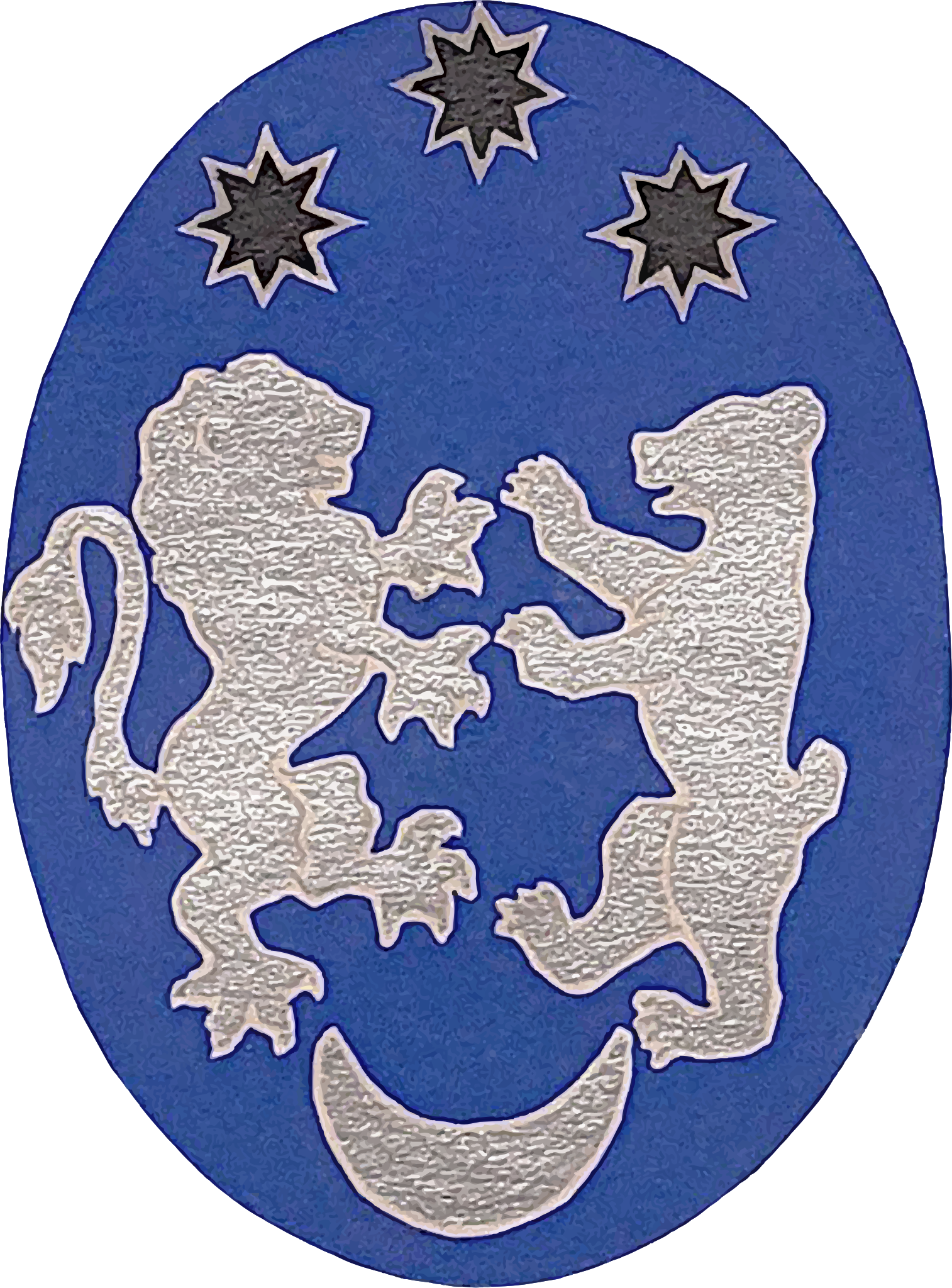
- Coat of Arms of the Bruni family
- Origin: Albania

The Bruni were a Venetian-Albanian medieval family dating back to the 13th century in Shkodër The family fled when the city was occupied by the Ottomans. Part of the family was located in modern day Koper in Slovenia. Giovanni Bruni is mentioned as the archbishop of Ulcinj in 1581. He became the archbishop in 1551 and participated in the council of Trent in 1563. He died from the Spanish who boarded his ship and killed him after the Battle of Lepanto despite yelling ”I am a Christian, I am a bishop”. In 1537, Antonio II of the Bruti-family married with Maria of the Bruni family in Ulcinj. Gasparo Bruni is mentioned as the first knight of Malta, servant of Sultan Murad III. The family was ”trans-imperial subjects” with members working as translators, merchants, and men of the church making them valuable to the Venetians and Ottomans.
