= Gulielm Blinishti =

Albanian noble

- Count, Marshal of the Kingdom of Albania

Marshal of Albania
- Reign: 1304–1319
- Predecessor: Andrea I Muzaka
- Successor: Post abolished.
- House: Blinishti
- Father: Vlado Blinishti

Gulielm Blinishti (fl. 1279–1319) was an Albanian nobleman of the Blinishti family which held lands across northern Albania during the 13th and 14th centuries. Gulielm is recorded for the first time in 1279 as having been captured by the Angevin authorities and sent to Brindisi as a prisoner on the accusation of treachery alongside other Albanian nobles such as Gjon Muzaka, Dhimitër Zogu, and his father Vlado Blinishti. It is known that in 1279 Vlado was imprisoned by the captain of Durazzo, Johannes Scoctus, possibly on the grounds of violating the agreement reached between Charles I of Anjou and the Albanian nobles in 1274, as well as his increasing political ties to the Kingdom of Serbia, where he obtained the title of kaznac. However, in 1304 Vlado would accept Angevin vassalage and consequently earn the title of comes while Gulielm would be appointed the marshal of Albania's forces (marascallum regni albanie) by Philip I of Taranto and his father Charles II of Naples. A papal bull of 1319 mentions Gulielm with the Byzantine title of prothosevastus, indicating his previous position and rank.
