= Albanian-Anjou Conflict =

Conflict between Albanian and French forces in medieval Albania Mainly over Durrës

- Part of the Thopia expansionist Wars
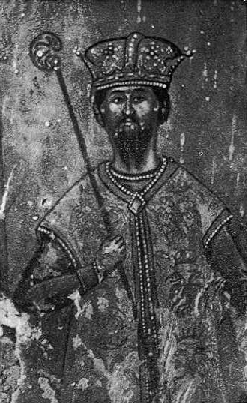
- Detail of icon of Karl Topia, made by Kostandin Shpataraku in the Ardenica Monastery in the 18th century.
Date	1358–1383
Location	Durrës, Albania, Epirus
Result	Albanian victory: The Principality of Albania Captures Durrës; End of the Angevin Kingdom of Albania

Belligerents
Principality of Albania	Angevin Kingdom of Naples; Navarrese Company; Kingdom of Navarre; Kingdom of France

Commanders and leaders
Karl Thopia	Joanna I of Naples (1358–1381); Louis I of Naples (1358–1362); Charles III of Naples (1381–1383); Louis of Évreux; Don Luis of Evreux †; Charles II of Navarre; Charles V of France

Strength
Unknown	Unknown

Casualties and losses
Unknown	Unknown

The Albanian-Anjou Conflict was a conflict between the Principality of Albania and the Anjou and their French allies, mainly over the city of Durrës. After Karl Thopia's initial capture of Durrës in 1367 the Angevins tried multiple times to re-gain the city with some attempts being successful. In 1383 Karl Thopia invaded and captured Durrës for the last time which led to the end of the Angevin Kingdom of Albania.

== Background ==
After the failure of the Eighth Crusade, Charles of Anjou returned his attention to Albania. He began contacting local Albanian leaders through local catholic clergy. Two local Catholic priests, namely Gjon from Durrës and Nicola from Arbanon, acted as negotiators between Charles of Anjou and the local noblemen. During 1271 they made several trips between Albania and Italy eventually succeeding in their mission. On 21 February 1272, a delegation of Albanian noblemen and citizens from Durrës made their way to Charles' court. Charles signed a treaty with them and was proclaimed King of Albania "by common consent of the bishops, counts, barons, soldiers and citizens" promising to protect them and to honor the privileges they had from Byzantine Empire. The treaty declared the union between the Kingdom of Albania (Latin: Regnum Albanie) with the Kingdom of Sicily under King Charles of Anjou (Carolus I, dei gratia rex Siciliae et Albaniae).

Charles of Anjou imposed a military rule on Kingdom of Albania. The autonomy and privileges promised in the treaty were "de facto" abolished and new taxes were imposed. Lands were confiscated in favor of Anjou nobles and Albanian nobles were excluded from their governmental tasks. In an attempt to enforce his rule and local loyalty, Charles I, took as hostages the sons of local noblemen. This created a general discontent in the country and several Albanian noblemen began contacting Byzantine Emperor Michael VIII who promised them, to acknowledge their old privileges.

== Thopia Revolt against the Anjou (1358) ==
In 1358, Karl revolted against the rule of the Anjou and managed to drive them out of Durrës from Epirus and Albania. He ruled most of modern central Albania from 1358 to 1388 and claimed the title of princeps Albaniae.

== Karl Thopia's Invasions of Durrës ==
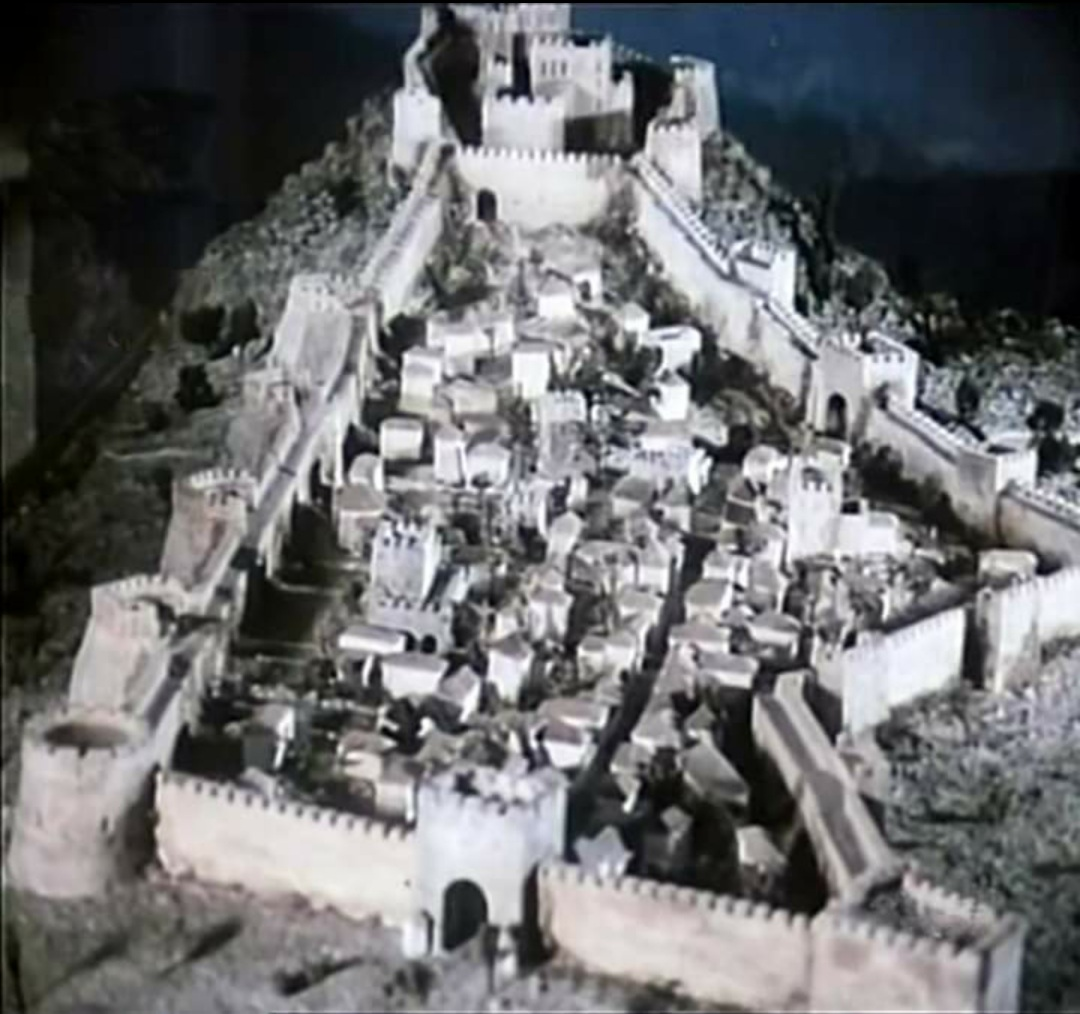
Model of Durrës Castle during the Middle Ages

=== Siege of Durrës (1362) ===
Since 1362, Karl sought Durrës, which was in the possession of Duchess Joanna. The first, certainly still unsuccessful siege lasted from April 1362 until May 1363. Then, Thopia had to withdraw his troops, who were weakened by an epidemic disease.

=== Siege of Durrës (1368) ===
Karl captured Durrës in 1368, which was where the Angevins held out due to their Kingdom becoming smaller in size. After this Karl had plans to turn this important port into his residence. After the capture Joanna, Duchess of Durazzo and her husband Louis of Évreux immediately began planning the reconquest of not only Durazzo, but all the lands of the former Angevin Kingdom of Albania. They were successful in gathering the support of Louis' brother Charles II the Bad the King of Navarre and Charles V King of France in this reconquest plan.

=== The Durrës Expedition of 1378 ===
Louis of Évreux's final attempt to assert his claim to the Kingdom of Albania began in the early 1370s. In 1372, Enguerrand VII de Coucy led the recruitment of 500 lances and 500 mounted archers from Gascony to bolster the ranks of the Navarrese Company, a mercenary group composed mainly of soldiers from Navarre and Gascony. These troops were gathered to support the campaign aimed at conquering the Kingdom of Albania.

By 1376, Louis had also enlisted four companies of knights from Navarre to reinforce his claim. Most of the soldiers in the Navarrese Company were recruited between 1375 and 1376 from Navarre and Gascony. They were paid 30 florins of Aragon per month, with the enrollment records preserved in the Cámara de Comptos archives in Pampeluna.

The Navarrese and Gascon soldiers made thorough preparations for the invasion of Albania, but details about the broader expedition are scarce. Louis received significant support from his brother, Charles II of Navarre, who provided men-at-arms, as well as financial backing of 50,000 ducats from Charles V of France. The Navarrese Company was commanded by four leaders: Pedro de la Saga and Mahiot de Coquerel, both chamberlains of the Navarrese king; John de Urtubia; and Garro (or Guarro), who is noted as a squire. The campaign for Durrës started in the midsummer of 1376, with Louis and the Navarrese Company successfully capturing the city, thereby reestablishing the Kingdom of Albania.

=== Siege of Durrës (1383) ===
After the death of Louis of Évreux in 1376 Durrës remained under the control of Joanna and her second husband Robert IV of Artois for a few years until Thopia invaded again in 1383, leading to the final disestablishment of the Angevin Kingdom of Albania.

== Aftermath ==
The Anjou would never return to Albania after the destruction of the Angevin Kingdom of Albania although many members of the Anjou dynasty would still make claims over Albania. Karl Thopia would rule over the regions of Durrës, Kruja, Peqin, Elbasan, Mokra and Gora, that is, along both sides of the Via Egnatia as far east as Lake Ohrid.

== Sources ==
- Anamali, Skënder; Prifti, Kristaq (2002). Historia e popullit shqiptar në katër vëllime (in Albanian). Botimet Toena. ISBN 978-99927-1-622-9.
- Ducellier, Alain (1999). "Albania, Serbia and Bulgaria". In Abulafia, David (ed.). The New Cambridge Medieval History, Volume 5, c.1198–c.1300. Cambridge: Cambridge University Press. pp. 779–795. ISBN 978-1-13905573-4.
- Nicol, Donald MacGillivray (2010), The Despotate of Epiros 1267–1479: A Contribution to the History of Greece in the Middle Ages, Cambridge University Press, ISBN 978-0-521-13089-9
