= Antonio Bruni (merchant) =

Albanian commander & spy (c.1550–1598)

- Born: c. 1550; Ulcinj
- Died: 1598 (aged 47–48); Trieste
- Citizenship: Venetian
- Education: Jesuit
- Occupations: Commander and spy
- Years active: 1570–1591
- Employer: Venice
- Known for: Being the first Albanian author of Lazaro Soranzos L'Ottomanno (1598)
- Spouse: Maria Bruni
- Father: Gasparo Bruni
- Relatives: Bartolomeo Bruti (nephew); Benedetto Bruti and Jacomo Bruti
- Family: Bruni family

Antonio Bruni (c. 1550 – 1598) was an Albanian commander and spy from Ulcinj, part of the Albanian Bruni family. Members of the Bruni family worked for the Venetians, the Papacy and the Ottomans. The Ottoman conquest of the city forced Bruni eventually to flee to Venice where he was educated by the Jesuits in May 1572 in Rome and he was a doctorate in Avignon. He also worked for one of his cousins in Moldavia. Bruni's father was Gasparo Bruni, the first knight of Malta and the commander of the Papacy's fleet during the Battle of Lepanto. In August 1591, Bruni returned to Koper and was elected as the overseer of the grain store.

== Affiliation with Peter the Lame ==
Petru the Lame, the Voivode of Moldavia, abandoned his throne and fled to Habsburg territory where he contacted Bruni in Koper in 1592, according to a letter which Bruni presented to the elected pope Clement VIII in Rome. Before Petru's departure, he received a loan of 11,300 ducats in advance from a Ragusan merchant in Moldavia named Giovanni de Marini Poli who had come to collect sheep and cattle. However Petru fled and the new Voivode Aaron refused to pay his predecessor's debts. Marini Poli pursued Petru for the money and in May 1593, Antonio Bruni traveled to Bolzano where Petru was and made him sign a legal document empowering Antonio to speak and act on Petru's behalf. This proved that Bruni was fluent in Romanian. For seven months Bruni stayed in Tyrol helping Petru with his legal defense in court against Marini Poli. In 1594 Petru died and his family members stripped the house of possessions which Bruni opposed. He also felt a special responsibility for the son of Petru, Stefan. In 1596 he submitted a memorandum to the Austrians suggesting an anti-Ottoman geostrategic plan.

== Life and death ==
Bruni had an insiders view of the empire; his work had taken him to such places as Vlorë on the Adriatic coast, Constanța on the Black Sea coast, and he also stayed in Moldavia. In his writings, he identified the ancestors of the Albanians with Goths or Macedonians. Bruni was a friend of Innocentius Stoicinus, bishop of Lezhë in August 1596. According to Mekjashi in 1603, Bruni had intervened in Rome to save Stoicinus from punishment for immoral behavior. Bruni was the first Albanian to write a general description of Albania which was a major source of information in Lazaro Soranzos L'Ottomanno (1598). It is believed that Bruni died from the plague during his travels between Koper and Bolzano in Trieste, July 1598.
