= Bruti family =

Albanian noble family

Bruti
- Noble family
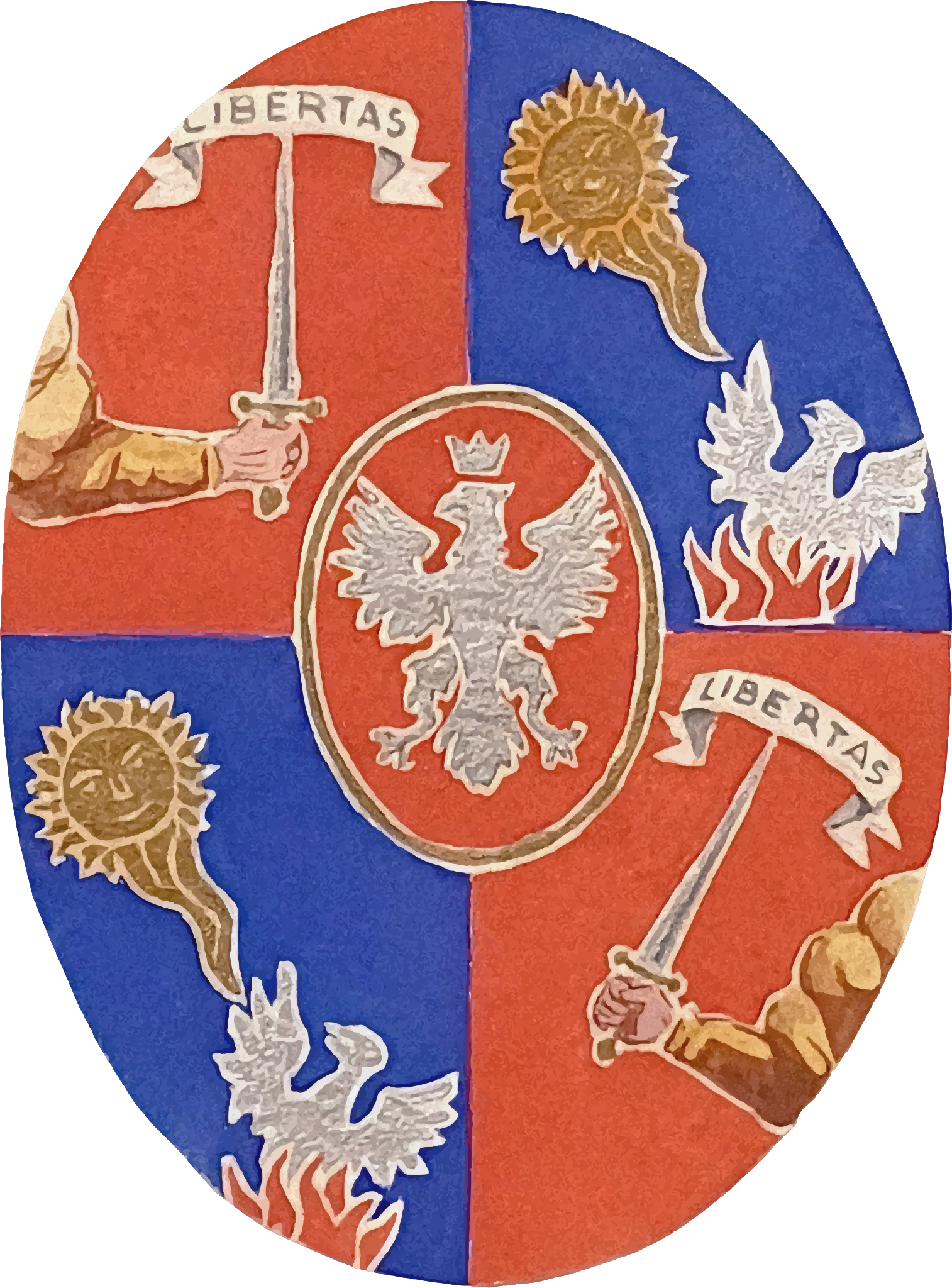
- Coat of Arms of the Bruti family
- Origin: Albania
- Founded: 1285
- Founder: Marco Bruti

The Bruti were a noble Albanian family which began with Marco Bruti born in 1285 who was the signore of Durrës. In 1361, he recognized Venetian rule in the city in return for defense against the Turkish conquest. The family hosted many soldiers and merchants. Antonio Bruti, (b. 1446), married Oria Kastrioti, cousin of Gjergj Kastrioti Skanderbeg. Antonio Bruti fled to Lezhë and fathered a son named Barnabi, born in 1479, who later married Gioia Capelichio, part of one of the oldest Albanian families. They had two children, Antonio II Bruti (1515–1571) and Marco Bruti. Antonio II stayed in Ulcinj and married Maria Bruni, the daughter of Matteo Bruni, the former feudal lord of Shkodër. Antonio II was executed by hanging when the Turks occupied the city and arrested him. His sons, Marco and Giacobbe, returned to Koper after a bounty was put on their heads. In 1560, Antonio Bruti sent a petition from his home in Ulcinj listing the services he had performed. He also mentions in 1556 that there is a serious shortage of grain on Corfu (following the Sultans ban on exports). Antonio was the father of the diplomat and spy Bartolomeo Bruti. In 1559, Luigi Moncenigo mentions the family in a book about the families of Venice. The family had four archbishops; Pieter of Kotorr (1588), Antonio of Ulcinj, Gaicomon of Novigrad, (1671–1679) and Agostin in Koper. In 1611, Alessandro Bruti is mentioned in Capodistria. Agostino Kont de Bruti is mentioned in Koper and Venice and later in the service of the Douda and Cornari family in Venice. Giovanni and Antonio Bruti, as well as the Captains Marco and Cristofor Bruti are mentioned in a document referring to the re-opening of a cathedral with the bishop of Novigrad Giacomo Bruti in 1735. According to Giuseppe Bonzo, responsible for the burial of Agostino Kont de Bruti, Antonio Bruti fought in the war of More against the Turks in Corfus, was captured, survived and then returned and was honored with the title of Saint Stefan. In 1714, Count Barnabi Bruti ordered that the house of Bruti was to be built in Koper. The castle was finished by Giorgio Massari (1687–1766). In 1951, the house was made into a public library.
