= Blinishti family =

Albanian noble family from the 12th-14th century AD

Blinishti
- Noble family
- Founded: Before 13th century
- Titles: Comes (Count); Protosebastos (High court title); Miles (Knight); Marascallum Regni Albaniae (Marshal of Albania); Comes Regni Albaniae (Count of the Kingdom of Albania)
- Members: Vlado Blinishti; Kalojan Blinishti; Gulielm Blinishti
- Estate: Northern Albania
- Dissolution: After 1330

The Blinishti (incorrectly, Bleusi, Bleuisti, Bletisti, Blevisci) were a medieval Albanian feudal family that held lands in modern northern Albania between the thirteenth and fourteenth centuries.

== Historiography ==
The family governed a territory spanning from Gjadër in the west to Mali i Shejtit in the east, and from Fushë-Arrëz in the north to Ndërfanda in the south of their domain. Their core settlement was modern Blinisht north of Lezhë. St. Stephen's Church in Blinisht is believed to have been built by the Blinishti family in the 13th century.

According to Milan Šufflay, the Blinishti were from the Matasei tribe of Mati. The earliest attestation of the Blinishti comes from an Angevin document of 1274 outlining an agreement between Charles I of Anjou and a number of Albanian nobles. In the document, Vlado Blinishti (Blado Bletista) is mentioned. Prior to his engagement with the Angevins, Vlado was likely a stratioti with political ties to both the Byzantines and Serbs (indicated by his identification with Caznecio Blinishti). In 1279, Vlado was captured by the captain of Durazzo and imprisoned in Brindisi on grounds of disrespecting the conditions of the aforementioned agreement. However, in 1304 Vlado accepted Angevin suzerainty and was freed, receiving the title of comes from Philip I of Taranto. His son, Gulielm, was given the position of Albania's marshal (marascallum regni albanie duximus ordinandum) by the Angevins on top of his older title of protosevastos given previously by the Byzantines. Another member of this family, Kalojan Blinishti, is mentioned between 1304 and 1319 and also bore the title of comes. A letter of 1304 claims Kalojan to have been the brother of a certain Blasius who may have been Vlado. Following the Albanian rebellion against the Serbs in 1319-36, instigated by Pope John XXII, the Blinishti no longer appear in the historical record, their territory likely being split by the Dukagjini and Thopia families.
