= Muzaka chronicles =

Muzaka Chronicles
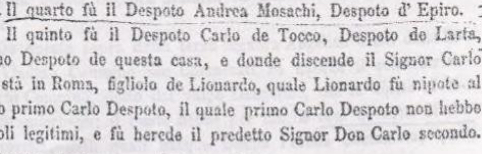
- Extract from the Muzaka Chronicle on page 293 mentioning Andrea II Muzaka
- Date: 1510-1515
- Author: Gjon Muzaka
- Dedicated to: Muzaka family
- Script: Latin Script
- Contents: Brief information about Muzaka and the medieval history of Albania.

The Muzaka Chronicles (Albanian: Kronika ë Muzakës) also known as the Memoire of Gjon Muzaka was a chronicle written by Albanian nobleman Gjon Muzaka of the noble Muzaka family from Albania. It was written in 1510 during the late Middle Ages. It contains important information about the history of Albania as well as a glimpse into the life and reign of Albanian nobility.

== Background ==
His memoir is considered to be the oldest substantial text written by an Albanian. It was originally written in Latin and Gjon's name was listed as Giovanni Musachi. In it he mentions several interesting things that were confirmed to have been accurate by Noel Malcolm, such as Andrea Gropa joined Andrea II Muzaka and the Balšić family against Prince Marko of Serbia.

== Context ==
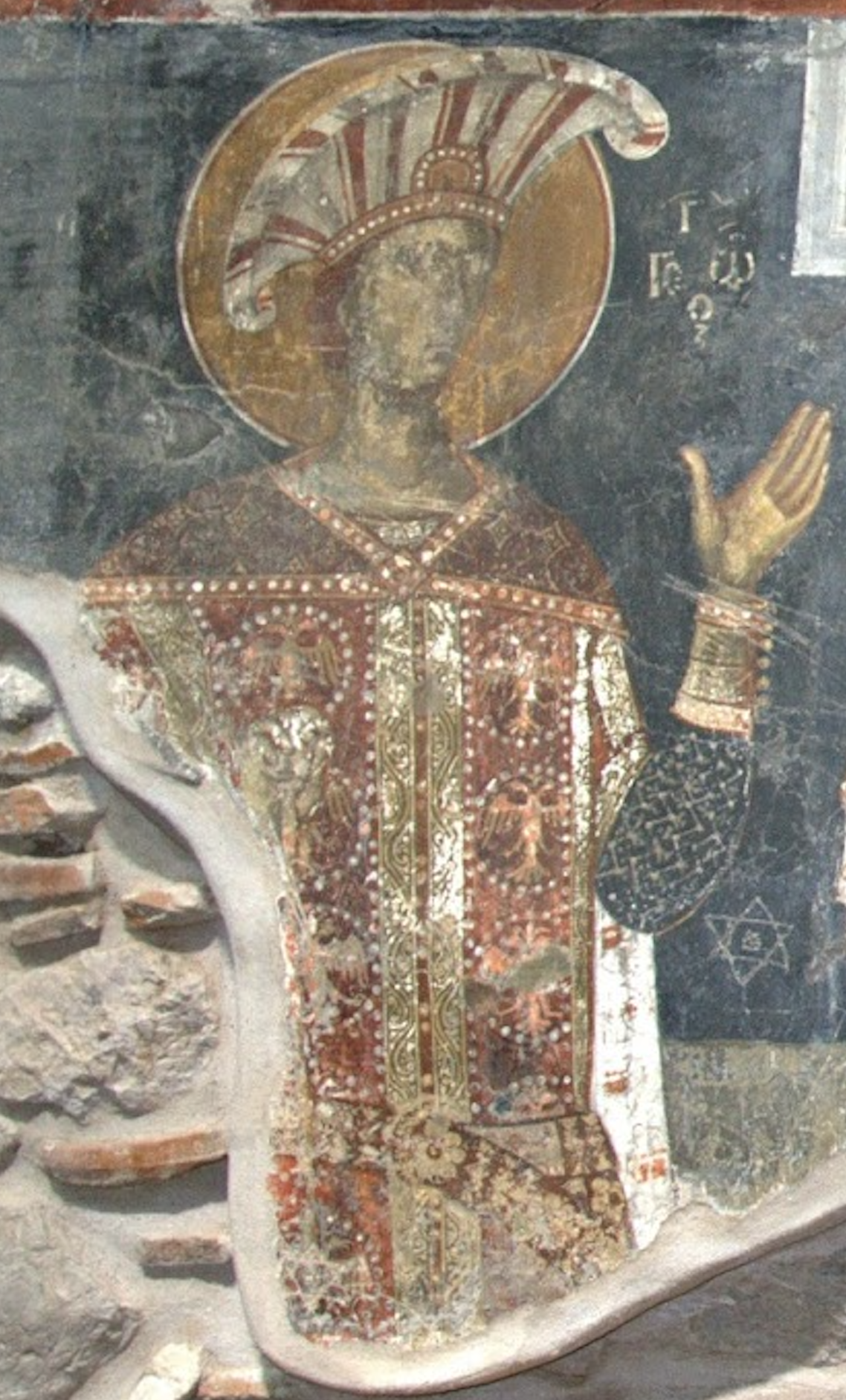
Fresco of Andrea II Muzaka found in the Church of St. Athanasius of Mouzaki in Kastoria, Greece

The chronicle is dedicated to Gjon writing to his descendants about the history and family. He mentions that Andrea II Muzaka had been getting wind of the activities of King Vukashin and assembled a "great army2 with Barons, Nobles and friends. As the day dawned, Vukašin was "vanquished" and captured in battle alongside a son of his called 'Duslandi'. After the victory, he mentions that the Byzantine Emperor was rejoiced that Andrea II had defeated his "worst foe" and the emperor bestowed him a coat of arms of a double-headed eagle crowned with a star on top. He was also given the title Despot of Epirus.

Within the chronicle, the death of Andrea II mentions that the land he owned was divided by his three sons, Gjin I Muzaka, Teodor II Muzaka and Stoya Muzaka who were his Heirs. It also mentions his daughters Comita Muzaka and Chiranna Muzaka. According to Gjon Muzaka, he left all of his land, with the exception of Berat, Myzeqe and Castoria, to his first-born son, Lord Gjin. To his second son Lord Theodore he left Berat and Myzeqe, and to his third son Stoya he left Kastoria with all its villages and estates.

In another extract of the chronicle he mentions that the Muzaka have ruled over Epirus. He claims that the word "Musachi" (Muzaka) is a corruption from the ancient Epirote tribe of Molossians (Molossachi) who inhabited Eprius.

Gjon also mentions his family. He mentions that he has three sons and two daughters:

- Theodore Muzaka
- Adrian Muzaka
- Constantine Muzaka
- Helena Muzaka
- Porphida Muzaka, who is staying with Queen Joan of Sicily, sister of the Catholic king, who is Queen of Naples and the wife of King Ferdinand the Elder.

== Criticism ==
The chronicle has been criticised as a self-contained work and downplayed other Albanian noble families. Gjon described that Pal Kastrioti ruled over "only two villages" has been disputed because if true, it would mean that his son, Gjon Kastrioti who ruled over a much larger area rose to power in the span of one generation. This is considered a very unlikely trajectory in the context of Albanian medieval society because noble families had acquired their area of influence over multiple generations in a complex system of affiliation with local village communities and intermarriage to each other.

== See also ==
- Muzaka family
- Gjon Muzaka
- Church of St. Athanasius of Mouzaki
