= Battle of Pelister Mountain =

Alleged 1369 battle between Andrea II Muzaka and Vukašin Mrnjavčević

Battle of Pelister
- Part of the fragmentation of the Serbian Empire
| Date | c. 1369 |
| Location | Pelister mountain range (modern North Macedonia) |
| Result | Albanian Victory |

Belligerents
| Principality of Muzaka | Forces of King Vukašin Mrnjavčević |

Commanders and leaders
| Andrea II Muzaka | Vukašin Mrnjavčević |

The Battle of Pelister was an alleged armed engagement around 1369 between Albanian nobleman Andrea II Muzaka, ruler of the Principality of Muzaka, and Serbian King Vukašin Mrnjavčević over territorial claims in southwestern Macedonia, including Kastoria.

According to the early 16th-century family chronicle written by Gjon Muzaka, Andrea II Muzaka assembled an army and confronted Vukašin's forces at Pelister mountain after the Serbian king marched into Muzaka territory. The battle reportedly ended in a decisive victory for Muzaka, with Vukašin captured as a prisoner. In recognition of this success against a Byzantine rival, Emperor John V Palaiologos allegedly granted Andrea II the title of Despot and a new coat of arms featuring a double-headed eagle.

The event is primarily attested in the Breve memoria de li discendenti de nostra casa Musachi (1510/1515) by Gjon Muzaka, a descendant writing in exile in Italy. No contemporary Byzantine, Serbian, or Ottoman sources directly confirm the battle or the capture of Vukašin, who is historically documented as dying at the Battle of Maritsa in 1371.

Following Vukašin's death at Maritsa, Andrea II Muzaka, allied with Andrea Gropa and the Balšić family, expanded into Kostur (Kastoria) and other areas previously held by Vukašin's son Prince Marko.

Historians regard the account as reflecting Muzaka family traditions but treat details like Vukašin's capture with caution due to lack of independent corroboration.
