= Teodor I Muzaka =

14th century Albanian prince and warlord

- Protosebastos
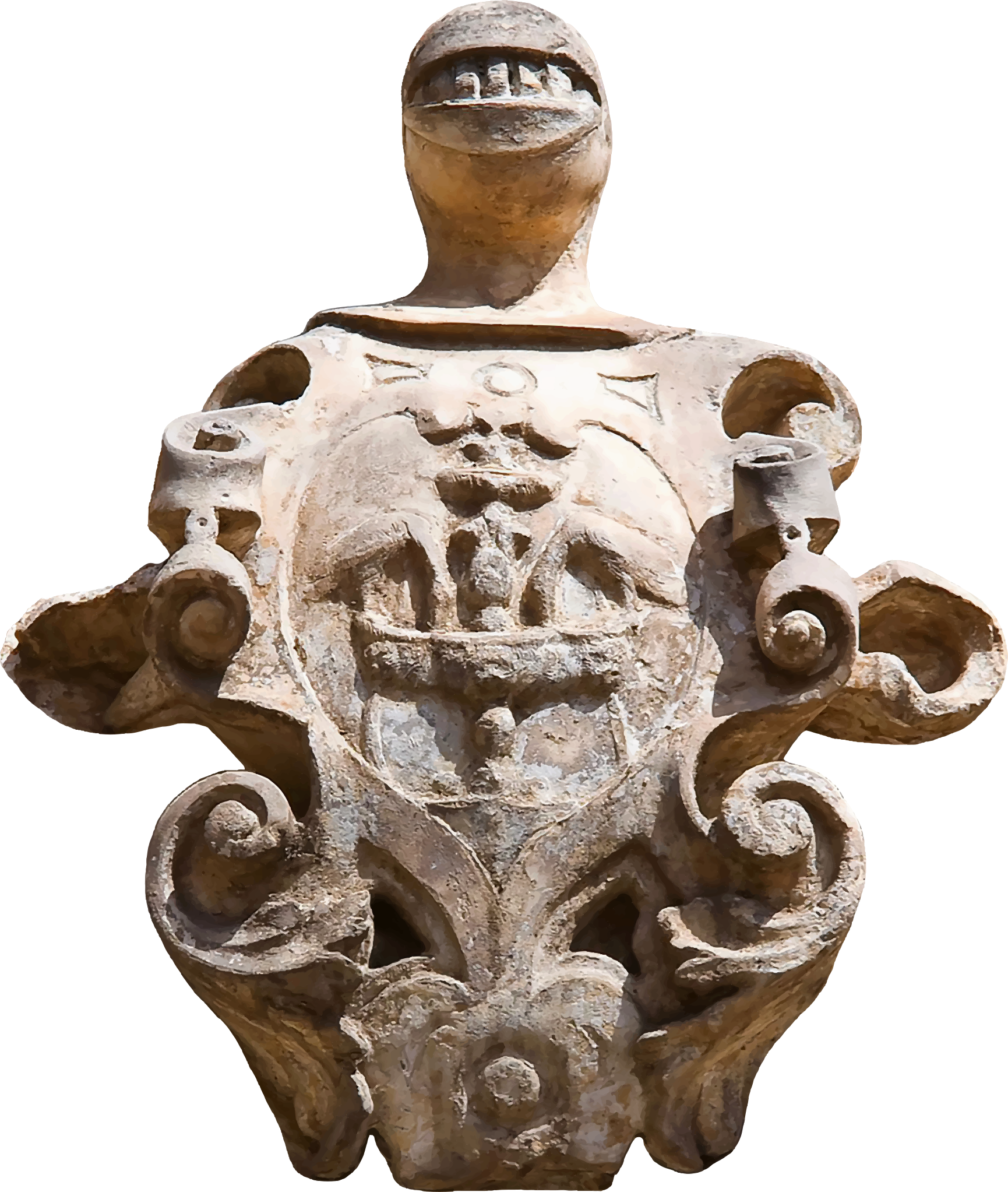
- Coat of Arms of the Muzaka family

Protosebastos and Ruler of Muzaka
- Reign: 1319–1331
- Predecessor: Andrea I Muzaka
- Successor: Andrea II Muzaka
- Died: 1331
- Spouse: Daughter of Paul of Ohrid- Possibly Pal Gropa
- Issue: Andrea II Muzaka; Mentulo Muzaka
- Dynasty: Muzaka
- Father: Andrea I Muzaka
- Religion: Eastern Orthodoxy

Teodor I Muzaka (died 1331) was an Albanian nobleman who ruled the Lordship of Berat between 1319 and 1331. According to John Musachi, he had the nickname "këshetesi", meaning the one with braided hair.

== Life ==
Theodor I, the son of Andrea I Muzaka, inherited his father's property after his death in 1319. The area ranged from Myzeqe with the center Berat in what is now Central Albania, via Skrapar, Tomorricë to Këlcyra in what is now southern Albania.

Theodor I, who carried the high Byzantine Empire court title of Protosebastus, lived in troubled times. After the murder of Despot of Epirus, Thomas Komnenos Dukas Angelos (1296–1318), by his nephew Nicholas Orsini, the Palatinate of Kefalonia became this new despot of Epirus. This usurpation of the throne called the Byzantines, Anjou and Serbs on the scene. Everyone tried to secure a share in the shattered despotate. The Serbian king Stefan Uroš II Milutin prepared for the submission of Albania. As early as June 1319 he assumed the title of ruler of Rascia, Dioclea, Albania and the coastal sea coast. His next destination was Durrës in what is now Albania, which had belonged to the Kingdom of Naples since 1271. There Stefan Uroš II tried to win a party for himself. In 1319 there was an uprising against the Anjou and the residents of the city paid homage to the Serbian king.

In order to counter the further advance of the enemies, who stormed the Angevin lands from all sides, tried Philip of Taranto from the House of Anjou from 1294 to 1332 his brother, the king Karl Martell of Hungary and the ban Wladin of Bosnia to win the league against the Serbs. At the same time, Pope John XXII admonished the "great" Albania, who had been surrendered to the Catholic Church in 1318, the Protosebastos Wilhelm Blevisti, and Theodor I Muzaka, the Mentulo or Matarango, Count of Këlcyra (son of Theodor I), Andrea II Muzaka (son of Theodor I), Count Wladislaw Conovic of Dioclea and the sea coast, Count Wilhelm of Albania, Paulus (or Pal) Materanga (son-in-law of Theodor I) and the other barons of the country loyal to the Angevin rule (1266–1356) to persevere and, where possible, do what you can to regain the lost places.

Theodor I died around 1331. His successor was his eldest son Andrea II Muzaka.

== Descendants ==
Theodor married the Daughter of Paul of Ohrid. Possibly daughter of Pal Gropa. Theodor had two sons:

- Andrea II Muzaka (1319 † 1372), Sebastokrator, "regni Albaniae marescallum" (royal marshal of Albania); ∞ Efthimia Matrënga (also: Etinia, Onorata), daughter of Paolo Matarango, lord of Gora; from 1335 despot of Berat
- Mentulo or Matarango, Count of Këlcyra

== See also ==
- Muzaka family
- Principality of Muzaka
- Church of St Athanasius of Mouzaki
