= Muzaka (disambiguation) =

The Muzaka family was an Albanian noble family that ruled over the region of Myzeqe (central Albania) in the Late Middle Ages.

Muzaka may also refer to:

- Gjergji Muzaka (born 1984), an Albanian professional footballer
- Lordship of Berat (Albanian: Principata e Muzakajve, 'Muzaka Principality'), a county created by Andrea II Muzaka with its capital at Berat
- Muzaka Berat, a former name of KF Tomori football club, from Berat, Albania

== See also ==
- Myzeqe or Myzeqeja or Musachia, a plain in the southwestern-central Albania
- Muzak, a brand of background music
