= Stoya Muzaka =

14th-century Albanian nobleman

Stoya Muzaka Stojë Muzaka
- Lord of Kostur; Co-prince of Muzaka
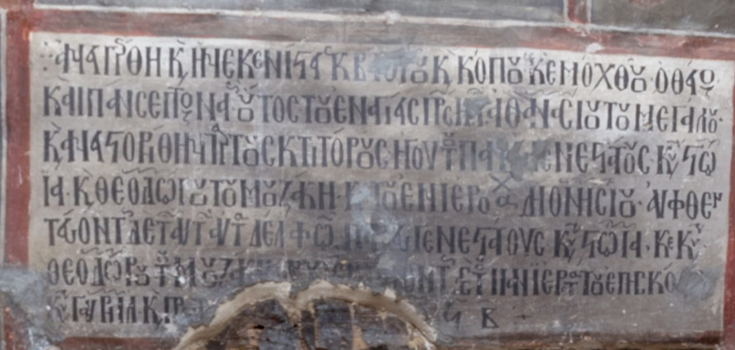
- An inscription from the Church of St. Athanasius of Mouzaki mentioning Stoya and his brother Teodor II Muzaka as the founders of the church.

Lord of Kastoria
- Reign: 1372-1384
- Predecessor: Andrea II Muzaka
- Successor: Gjin I Muzaka
- Died: 1384
- Dynasty: Muzaka
- Father: Andrea II Muzaka
- Mother: Euphemia Mataranga
- Religion: Eastern Orthodoxy

Stoya Muzaka (Albanian: Stojë Muzaka), also known as Stoja, was an Albanian nobleman, the Lord of Kastoria, and a member of the influential Albanian Muzaka family, which played a significant role in ruling parts of Southern Albania and Epirus.

== Life ==
Stoya Muzaka was born into the House of Muzaka as the third and youngest son of Andrea II Muzaka and Euphemia Mataranga, who was from the Mataranga family. His father, Andrea II Muzaka, significantly expanded the Principality of Muzaka, with Berat as its capital. Under Andrea II's rule, the principality reached its greatest extent, covering the regions of Myzeqe, Berat, Tomorricë, Skrapar, Këlcyrë, Përmet, Opar, Devoll, Kolonjë, and Kastoria.

Upon the death of his father Andrea II, his lands were divided among his three sons, Gjin I, Teodor II and Stoya. Gjin inherited the majority of his father’s holdings, except for Berat, Myzeqe, and Kastoria. Teodor received Berat and Myzeqe, while Stoya inherited Kastoria along with its associated villages and estates.

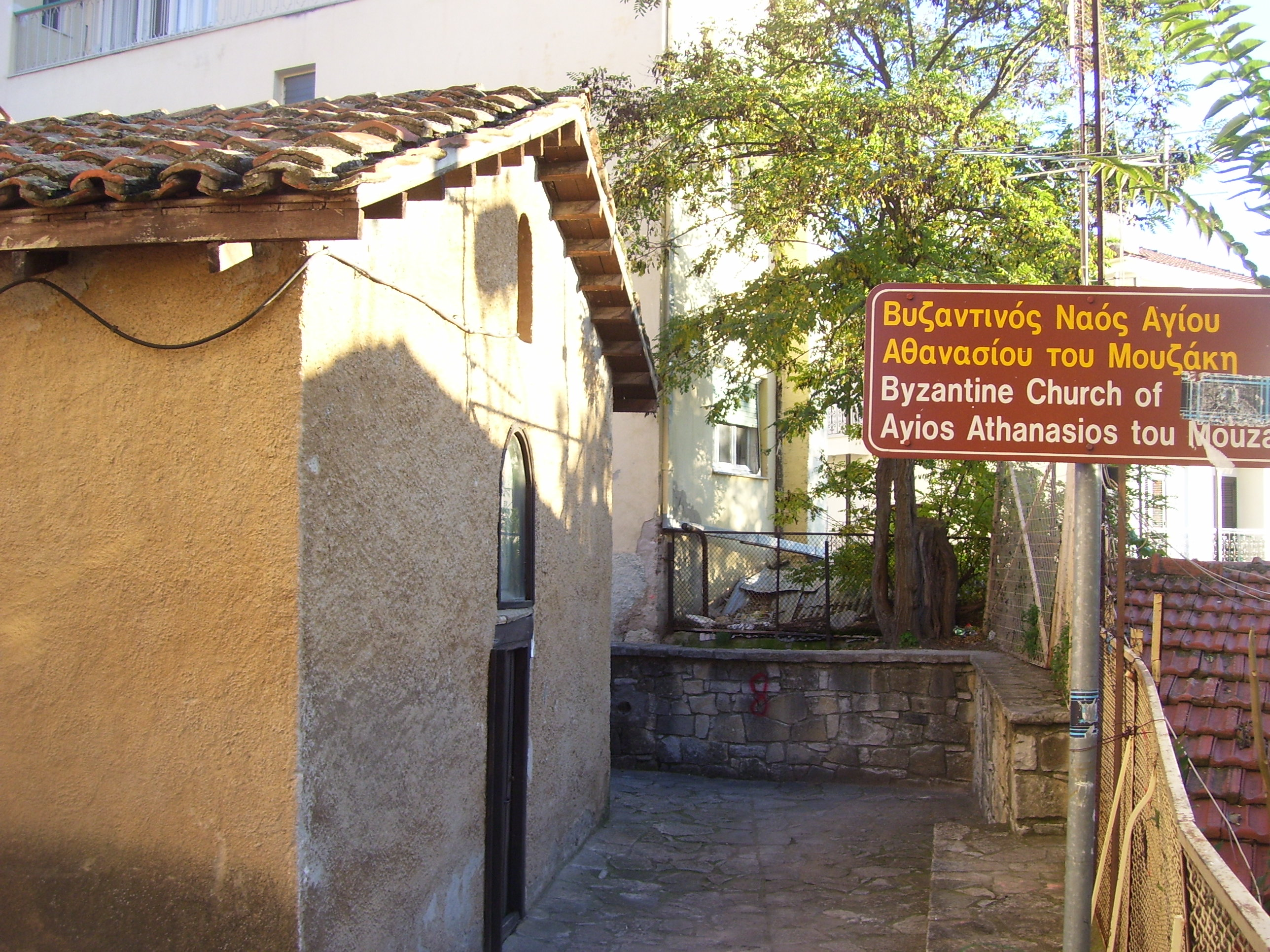
The front of the Church of St. Anthanasius of Mouzaki

During their rule over Kastoria, the construction of the Church of St. Athanasius of Mouzaki took place during the years 1383–84 and the church was dedicated to Athanasius of Alexandria. It is considered one of the most important monuments of 14th-century Kastoria and is the last church built in Kastoria before its annexation by the Ottoman Empire. The church is decorated with scenes of saints dressed in Byzantine clothing, a typical feature of Byzantine iconography. The frescoes are remarkable for depicting for the first time in Byzantine iconography, Jesus Christ and the Virgin Mary in imperial costume. The depiction of Virgin Mary as a queen is an atypical feature for the Byzantine iconography. Another unusual feature of the church is that, despite the fact that St. Alexander is traditionally not included among the ranks of military saints, the church of St Athanasius of Mouzaki is decorated with a portrait of St. Alexander and St. Mercurios in military clothing. The church influenced greatly the artistic production of Kastoria and Western Macedonia in the late 14th and early 15th century.

== Death and Succession ==
Stoya died after 1384 without leaving any heirs. Following his death, control of Kastoria and all the villages and estates belonging to it passed to his older brother, Gjin Muzaka.

== See also ==
- Muzaka family
- Principality of Muzaka
