= Gjin I Muzaka =

Gjin I Muzaka Gjin Muzaka
- Lord of Tomorniza; Lord of Kastoria
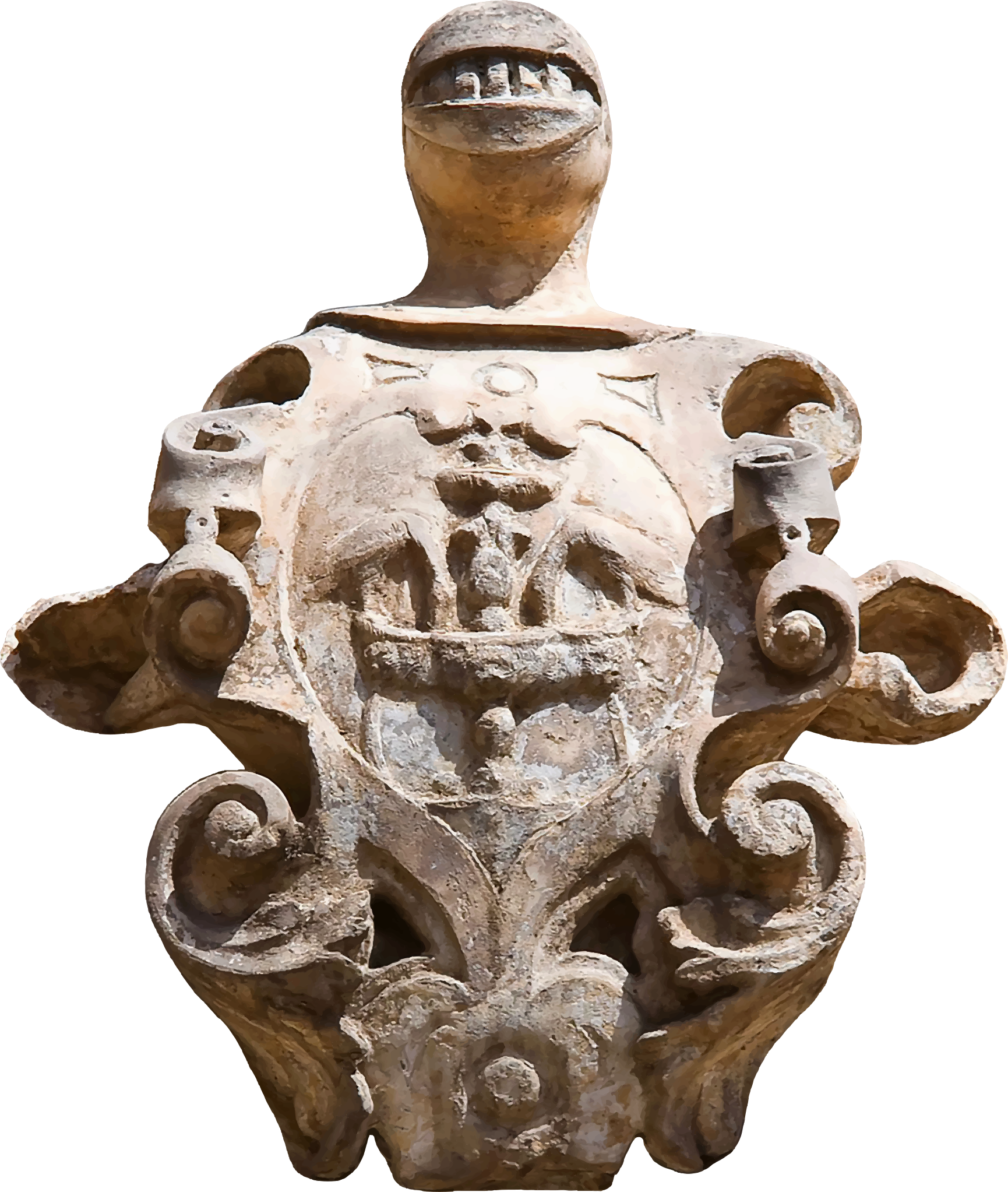
- Coat of Arms of the Muzaka family

Lord of Tomorniza
- Reign: 1372 - 1389
- Predecessor: Andrea II Muzaka
- Successor: Unknown

Lord of Kastoria
- Reign: 1384 - 1389
- Predecessor: Stoya Muzaka
- Successor: Unknown
- Born: 1337
- Died: 1389 (aged 51–52)
- Spouse: Suina Arianiti Comnena
- Issue: Andrea III Muzaka; Materango Muzaka; Blaise Muzaka; Bogdan Muzaka; Laldi Muzaka; Helena Muzaka; Condisa Muzaka
- Dynasty: Muzaka
- Father: Andrea II Muzaka
- Mother: Euphemia Mataranga
- Religion: Eastern Orthodoxy

Gjin I Muzaka (Albanian: Gjin Muzaka), was an Albanian Prince from the House of Muzaka. He held the majority of his father's holdings after his father's death and was the Lord of Tomorniza. As well as the Lord of Kastoria after his younger brother Stoya Muzaka died after 1384 leaving no heirs.

== Life ==
Gjin I Muzaka was born into the House of Muzaka as the first and oldest son of Andrea II Muzaka and Euphemia Mataranga, who was from the Mataranga family.

Upon the death of his father Andrea II, his lands were divided among his three sons, Gjin, Teodor II and Stoya. Gjin inherited the majority of his father's holdings, except for Berat, Myzeqe, and Kastoria. Teodor received Berat and Myzeqe, while Stoya inherited Kastoria along with its associated villages and estates.

== Issue ==
Gjin I Muzaka married Lady Suina Arianiti-Comneniates who was the daughter of Lord Materango Arianiti Comneniates. The pair had seven children:

- Andrea III Muzaka, married Chiranna Zenevisi, Lady of Grabossa
- Materango Muzaka
- Blaise Muzaka
- Bogdan Muzaka
- Laldi Muzaka
- Helena Muzaka
- Condisa Muzaka

== See also ==
- Muzaka family
- Principality of Muzaka

== Bibliography ==
- Anamali, Skënder (2002). Historia e popullit shqiptar [The history of the Albanian people] (in Albanian). Botimet Toena. ISBN 978-9-9927-1622-9.
- Elsie, Robert (2003). Early Albania A Reader of Historical Texts, 11th-17th Centuries. Harrassowitz. ISBN 978-3-4470-4783-8.
- Hopf, Karl (1873). Chroniques greco-romanes inedites ou peu connues [Unpublished or little-known Greco-Roman chronicles] (in French). Weidmann.
