= Andrea II Muzaka =

14th-century Albanian prince and warlord

- Despot of the Kingdom of Albania; Marshal of Albania; Despot of Epirus

Lord of Berat and Myzeqe
- Reign: 1331–1372
- Predecessor: Teodor I Muzaka
- Successor: Teodor II Muzaka

Lord of Kastoria
- Predecessor: Teodor I Muzaka
- Successor: Stoya Muzaka

Lord of Tomorniza
- Predecessor: Teodor I Muzaka
- Successor: Gjin I Muzaka
- Died: 1372 (aged 54)
- Burial: St. Anthony Church, Durrës
- Spouse: Euphemia Mataranga (m. 1328)
- Issue: Gjin I Muzaka; Teodor II Muzaka; Stoya Muzaka; Comita Muzaka; Chiranna Muzaka
- Dynasty: Muzaka
- Father: Teodor I Muzaka
- Mother: Daughter of Paul of Ohrid
- Religion: Eastern Orthodox

Andrea II Muzaka (c. 1318–1372), or Andrew II, was an Albanian nobleman of the Muzaka family and the ruler of the Principality of Muzaka in the 14th century. He inherited the principality from his father, Teodor I Muzaka, who died around 1331. Andrea II is known for having expanded the Principality of Muzaka to its greatest extent, from the southern Adriatic coastline of Albania in the west to Kastoria in the east by the time of his death in 1372.

He was recognised as Despot of the Kingdom of Albania and as Marshal of Albania by the Angevin Kingdom of Albania in 1336–37. In the next decade, he led the resistance against the Serbian invasions of Albania, and after the fall of the Serbian Empire, he regained his former territories and began to expand again. During his wars against the Serbian successor states, Andrea II succeeded in defeating both Vukašin of Serbia and his son, Prince Marko, solidifying his family's principality. He was recognized as Despot of Epirus by the Byzantine Emperor John V Palaiologos for his victories against the Serbians.

== Early reign ==
Andrea II Muzaka came from the wealthy Albanian Muzaka noble family of southern Albania. His grandfather, Andrea I Muzaka, established de facto independent territorial rule from the Byzantine Empire around 1280 in the Myzeqe region west of Berat, which was later named after the family. Andrea I was succeeded by Teodor, also known as "Këshetisi". Teodor's son, Andrea II, would become the most prominent ruler of the Muzaka noble family in the medieval era. Like his father, Andrea II served the Angevins as the titular marshal of Albania as well as the Byzantines. He held various other titles such as sebastokrator, and was recognized as despotus Regni Albaniae (despot of the Kingdom of Albania) and Marshal of Albania by the Angevins. His father, Teodor, was recognized as prothosevastor. At the beginning of his rule he exercised nominal control over much of the country's Adriatic Sea between the Vjosa and Devoll rivers eastwards. In practice, this continued to be dominated by the historic Albanian noble families who paid little heed to Muzaka's authority.

=== Revolt against the Byzantines ===
Sometime before 1335, Andrea II was recognised with the title of Despot by the Byzantines, who still ruled over most Albanian territories despite the increasing independence of local Albanian rulers. During the years of 1335–1341, Andrea II led a revolt against the Byzantines in southern Albania. Andrea II had simultaneously allied himself with the Angevins of Naples, signing an agreement with Louis, the nephew of King Robert, on 30 December 1336. As part of this agreement, Andrea II swore fealty to the Neapolitan king, who in turn confirmed Andrea II's titles and his right to rule over the lands granted to him by the Byzantines. Additionally, one of his sons was to be kept as a royal hostage by the Angevins in Durrës. Also, as part of this agreement, members of the Muzaka family were allowed to travel freely to and from Angevin-controlled Durrës, and the friendly ties between the two noble families remained up until the Muzaka family fled from the Ottoman conquest of Albania.

The suppression of these anti-Byzantine uprisings was accompanied by the dispossession and expulsion of many nobles of the Muzaka family, who took refuge in Greece, especially in the Peloponnese.

=== Resistance against Stefan Dušan ===
During 1341–1347, the Byzantine Empire was engaged in a civil war, and the Serbians capitalised on this situation by invading much of the Byzantine holdings within the southern Balkans. Andrea II led the resistance against the Serbs and formed various alliances with other Albanian noble families, as well as maintaining ties with his traditional Angevin allies. In 1336, the Kingdom of Serbia under Stefan Dušan captured Angevin-controlled Durrës. Although the Angevins managed to recapture Durrës, Dušan continued his expansion, and, during the years of 1337–1345, he had captured Kanina and Valona.

Andrea II Muzaka waged war against the Serbian forces around 1340. In an alliance with the Gropa family, he would have several successful campaigns against Dušan, but his domains were soon invaded by the Serbian king, along with the other Albanian principalities. In 1345, all Albanian lands were under Serbian rule except for Durrës, which was under Angevin control. It is uncertain whether the Serb troops were able to capture any towns or exert control over these areas of southern Albania, despite their incursions into the region. Although some historians attribute the acquisition of several towns to this period, others suggest that the Serbs only obtained submission, which may have been nominal, from different Albanian tribes. Nonetheless, Andrea II continued to resist the local lord appointed by Stefan Dušan to govern the regions of Berat and Vlorë, John Komnenos Asen. In 1350, Andrea II seized Berat from the Serbians, which forced Komnenos Asen to move his seat to Kanina.

== Later reign ==
=== Return to power and battle of Pelister ===
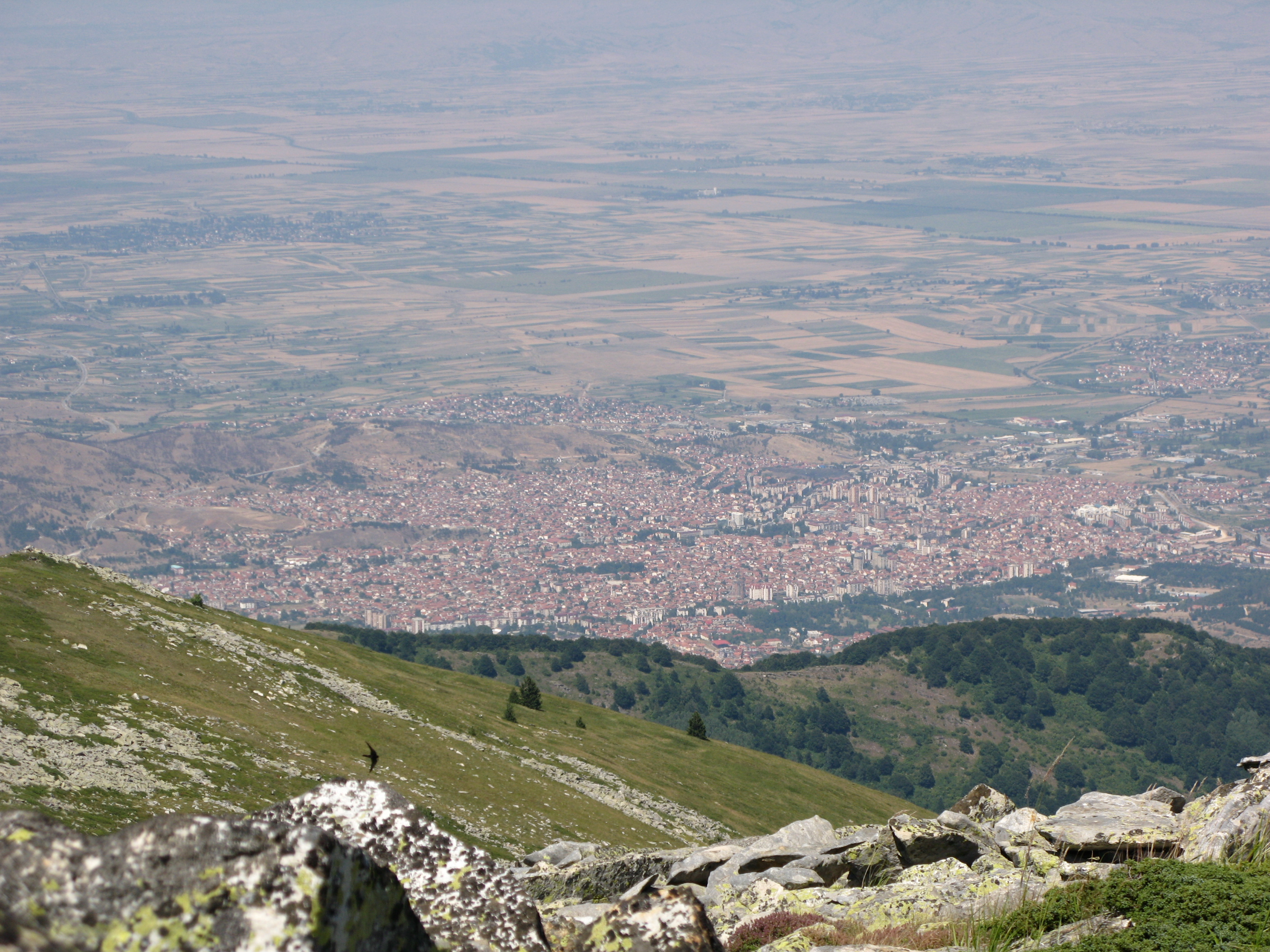
The Pelister mountain where forces of Andrea Muzaka defeated the Serbian army

After the death of Stefan Dušan in 1355 and the collapse of the short-lived Serbian Empire, Andrea II regained control over parts of south-eastern Albania and significantly expanded the principality. In the late 1360s, Andrea II was engaged in a conflict over the southwestern provinces of Macedonia (including Kastoria) against Vukašin Mrnjavčević, the King of Serbia. Both rulers had claims to inherit these regions after the death of Simeon Uroš; Vukašin had claimed it as the co-ruler of Stefan Uroš V, whereas Andrea II claimed it on the grounds that the border between Albania and Bulgaria lied at the Pelister mountain, specifically the Dobrida spring. Vukašin gathered an army and marched towards Muzaka's territory, prompting Andrea to gather an army of his own and confront the king at Pelister in 1369.

The battle at Pelister ended with the victory of Andrea II, and according to Albanian chronicler Gjon Muzaka, Vukašin himself was taken prisoner. As a result of this battle, the Byzantine Emperor John V Palaiologos presented Andrea II with the imperial emblem, and granted him the title of "despot of Epirus". In this occasion, Andrea II Muzaka adopted as his new coat of arms, the double-headed eagle under a star as a replacement for the traditional coat of arms of the Muzaka, which was a water spring that erupted from the ground and split in two.

=== Expansion ===
Towards the end of the 1360s, Andrea had annexed the Karavasta Lagoon and the strategically important Bregu castle from Albanian noble Vlash Matranga, later advancing onto Shkumbin and annexing the lands of Gosë and Garunjë, which brought him into direct conflict with Karl Thopia.

In 1371, Andrea II Muzaka came to another agreement with Andrea Gropa, his son-in-law, and waged war against Prince Marko, capturing Kastoria (which passed to Muzaka) and Ohrid, which passed to Gropa. Having lost heavy manpower at the Battle of Marica, Prince Marko was not able to resist the expansions of these neighbouring states. The loss of territory that Marko suffered during the subsequent wars significantly weakened his power and hindered his ability to raise new armies.

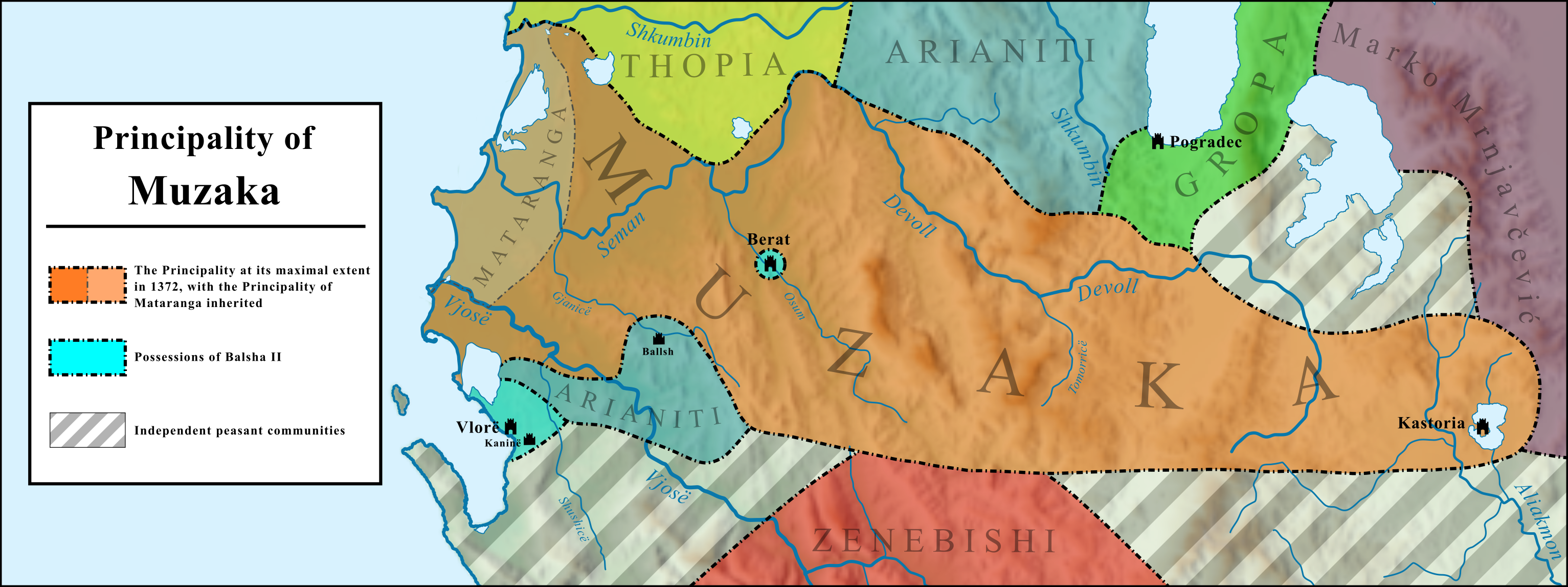
Principality of Muzaka around 1372.

During Andrea's conflicts with the Serbs, he must have controlled part of the hinterland of Vlorë, while after the death of Alexander Komnenos Asen (c. 1371) who possessed Vlorë and Kanina, Muzaka entered into an agreement with Balsha II. Under the agreement, Balsha II would support Muzaka against enemies like Marko, while Muzaka would recognize Balsha's claims to Kanina and Vlorë. It is unclear whether Muzaka had previously managed to conquer them and then gave them to Balsha as part of the agreement, or whether Balsha was planning to conquer them himself and the agreement simply reaffirmed his rights.

During the 1360s, Andrea had acquired Karavasta Lagoon and the strategically important Bregu castle from Albanian noble Blasius Mataranga, later advancing onto Shkumbin and annexing the lands of Gosa. He also directly confronted the Albanian ruler Karl Thopia. He later occupied Vlorë and Kanina from the principality of Valona.

== Possessions and properties ==
At its greatest extent, just before Andrea II's death, his expansion of the principality covered the regions of Myzeqe, Berat, Tomorricë, Skrapar, Këlcyrë, Përmet, Opar, Devoll, Kolonjë and Kastoria. Andrea II would die in 1372 and his lands were divided by his three sons: Teodor II, Gjin I and Stoya.

Andrea II also had noticeable influence in the city of Durrës, where he exercised his right to freely travel to the city and conduct business, as well as owning real estate in the city.

== Styles ==
=== Court and Titles ===
Gjon Muzaka wrote in his 16th-century testament that after defeating Vukašin of Serbia at Pelister, he received a new golden seal and a “despotic” throne. He also received a new coat of arms which was hammered into his new throne and fastened in with rich pearls. In addition, he was awarded the Byzantine court title of Despot, which according to Gjon Muzaka had the same social status to a King, and was the second-highest title to the Byzantine emperor. He later affirmed that individuals with such titles were referred to as “holy majesty” (Latin: sacra maestà).

=== Possible depiction ===
According to Albanian historian Pëllumb Xhufi, in the Church of St. Athanasius of Mouzaki (located in Kastoria, modern-day Greece), a fresco of St. George depicted in the Deesis is uniquely depicted compared to other depictions of the same Saint. The fresco shows wealthy imperial Byzantine attire wearing noble headgear, strangely unique to common depictions of the Saint, as well as double-headed eagle's painted on his robes, similarly painted to the one Gjon Muzaka attributed to Andrea. Xhufi theorised that this was a depiction of Andrea, and the inscription of St. George implied his social status as a warrior, since the Saint was also a Roman soldier and was known in Christian myths to have fought and slain a dragon.

== Family ==
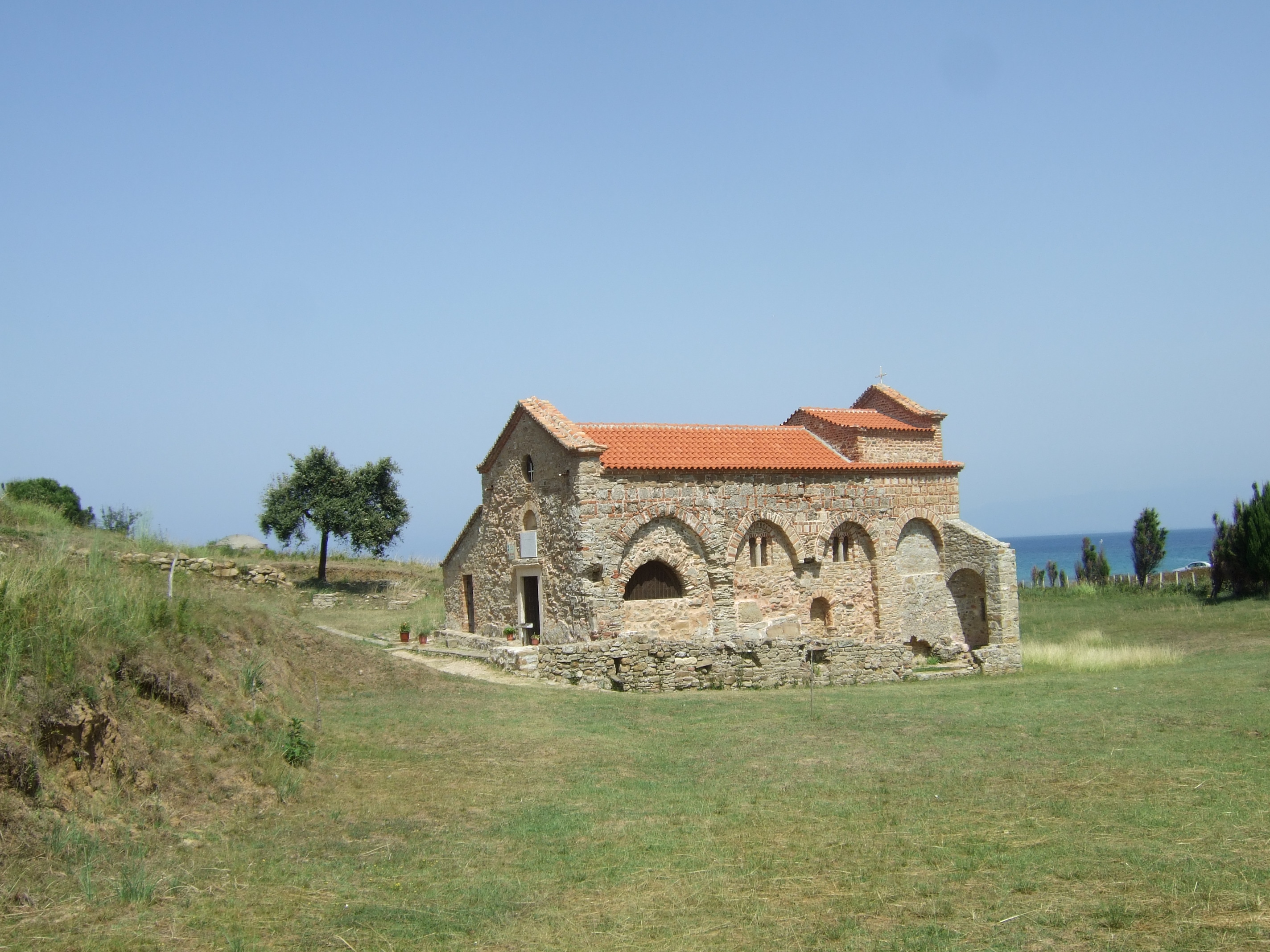
St. Anthony Church is the location where Andrea II Muzaka and his wife Euphemia Mataranga were married and then buried.

Andrea II married Lady Euphemia Matranga (Albanian: Efimia Matrënga) also called: Eythvmia, Etinia or Onorata; who was the daughter of Paul Mataranga, the Albanian Lord of Gora. They got married most likely around 1328, in the Church of Saint Anthony in Durrës.

The couple had five children:

1. Gjin I Muzaka (* around 1337; † 1389), who inherited most of his fathers lands, with the exception of Berat, Myzeqe and Kastoria. He married Lady Suina Arianiti-Comneniates, a daughter of the Albanian Lord Materango Arianiti, with whom he had 5 sons: Andrea III Muzaka, Materango Muzaka, Vlash Muzaka, Bogdan Muzaka and Laldi Muzaka
2. Teodor II Muzaka (* 1337; † after 1389), who inherited Berat and Myzeqe.
3. Stoya Muzaka († after 1384), who inherited Kastoria as well as its villages and estates. Unfortunately, he died early with no heirs, therefore his lands were passed down to his elder brother Gjin.
4. Lady Comita (or Komnene) Muzaka († 1392), who married Balsha II and secured an alliance between the Muzaka family and the Balsha family
5. Lady Chiranna Muzaka (also: Kyranna), who married Andrea Gropa of Ohër and Dibra. The couple had no living issue, thus their property was inherited by the Muzakas.

Andrea II and his wife Despotess Euphemia were both buried in the town of Durrës, in the Church of Saint Anthony, in a marble grave with the epitaph: 'Here lies Lord Andrew Molosachi, Despot of Epirus'.

== See also ==
- Muzaka family
- Principality of Muzaka
- Church of St Athanasius of Mouzaki
