= Teodor II Muzaka =

14th-century Albanian prince and warlord

- Lord of Berat; Lord of Myzeqe
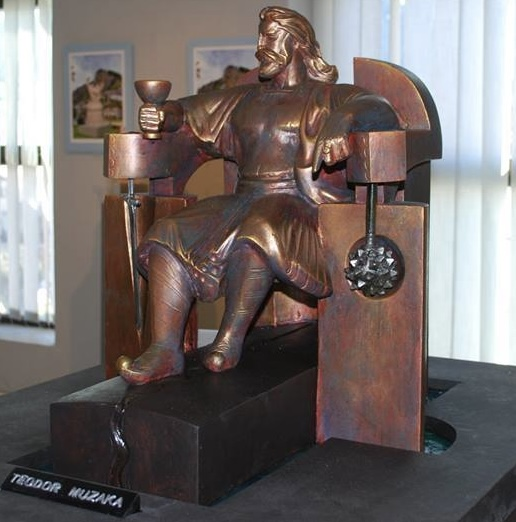
- Statue of Teodor II Muzaka

Lord of Berat & Myzeqe
- Reign: 1372–1389
- Predecessor: Andrea II Muzaka
- Successor: Teodor III Muzaka
- Born: 1337
- Died: 15 June 1389 (Aged 51 or 52); Battle of Kosovo, Kosovo Polje (modern Kosovo)
- Issue: Nicola Muzaka
- Dynasty: Muzaka
- Father: Andrea II Muzaka
- Mother: Euphemia Mataranga
- Religion: Eastern Orthodoxy

Teodor II Muzaka (Albanian: Teodor Muzaka), was an Albanian prince from the House of Muzaka. He was the Lord of Berat and Lord of Myzeqe.

== Life ==
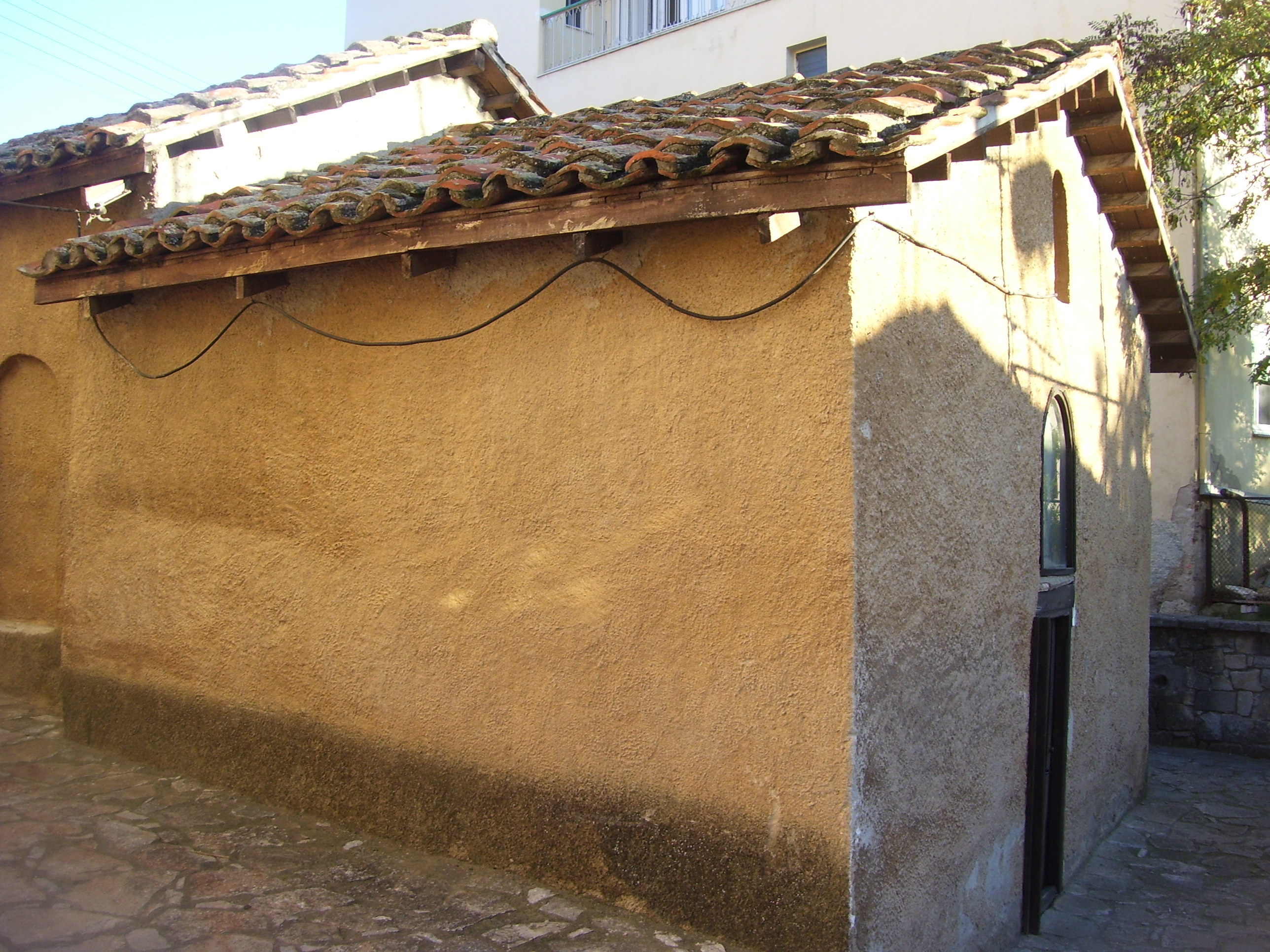
Church of St. Athanasius of Mouzaki in Kastoria built by Teodor II Muzaka and his brother Stoya Muzaka

Teodor II Muzaka was born into the House of Muzaka as the second son of Andrea II Muzaka and Euphemia Mataranga, who was from the Mataranga family.

Upon the death of his father Andrea II, his lands were divided among his three sons, Gjin I, Teodor II and Stoya. Gjin inherited the majority of his father’s holdings, except for Berat, Myzeqe, and Kastoria. Teodor received Berat and Myzeqe, while Stoya inherited Kastoria along with its associated villages and estates.

Between 1383 and 1384, Theodor II, together with his brother Stoya and the monk Dionysius, had a Greek Orthodox church (Church of St. Athanasius of Mouzaki) built in Kastoria, which was dedicated to Athanasius the Great.

== Succession ==
He died fighting during the Battle of Kosovo in 1389 on the side of the anti-Ottoman coalition led by Lazar of Serbia. After his death the rule of his domain passed over to his nephew Teodor III Muzaka. This could only happen because his only son Nicola must have been dead at the time or was held captive by his aunt Comita.

== See also ==
- Muzaka family
- Principality of Muzaka
- Church of St Athanasius of Mouzaki

== Notes and references ==
References:

== Sources ==
- Fine, John Van Antwerp (1994), The Late Medieval Balkans: A Critical Survey from the Late Twelfth Century to the Ottoman Conquest, University of Michigan Press, ISBN 978-0-472-08260-5
- Popović, Tanya (1988). Prince Marko:the hero of South Slavic epics. Syracuse, N.Y.: Syracuse University Press. ISBN 978-0-8156-2444-8.
