= Principality of Muzaka =

Medieval Albanian Principality

Lordship of Berat Principata e Muzakajve (Albanian)
- 1279–1450
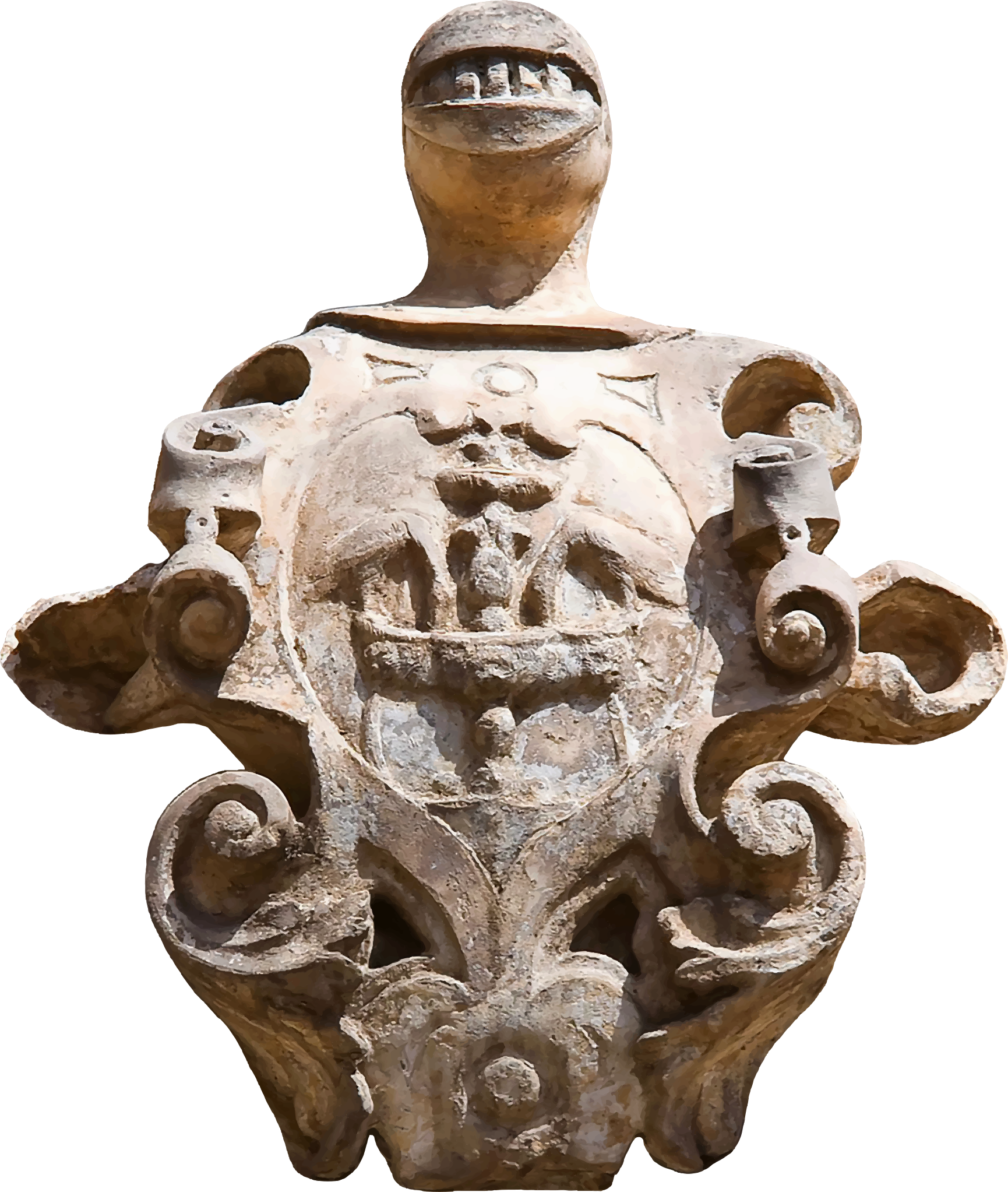
- Coat of arms of the Muzaka Family

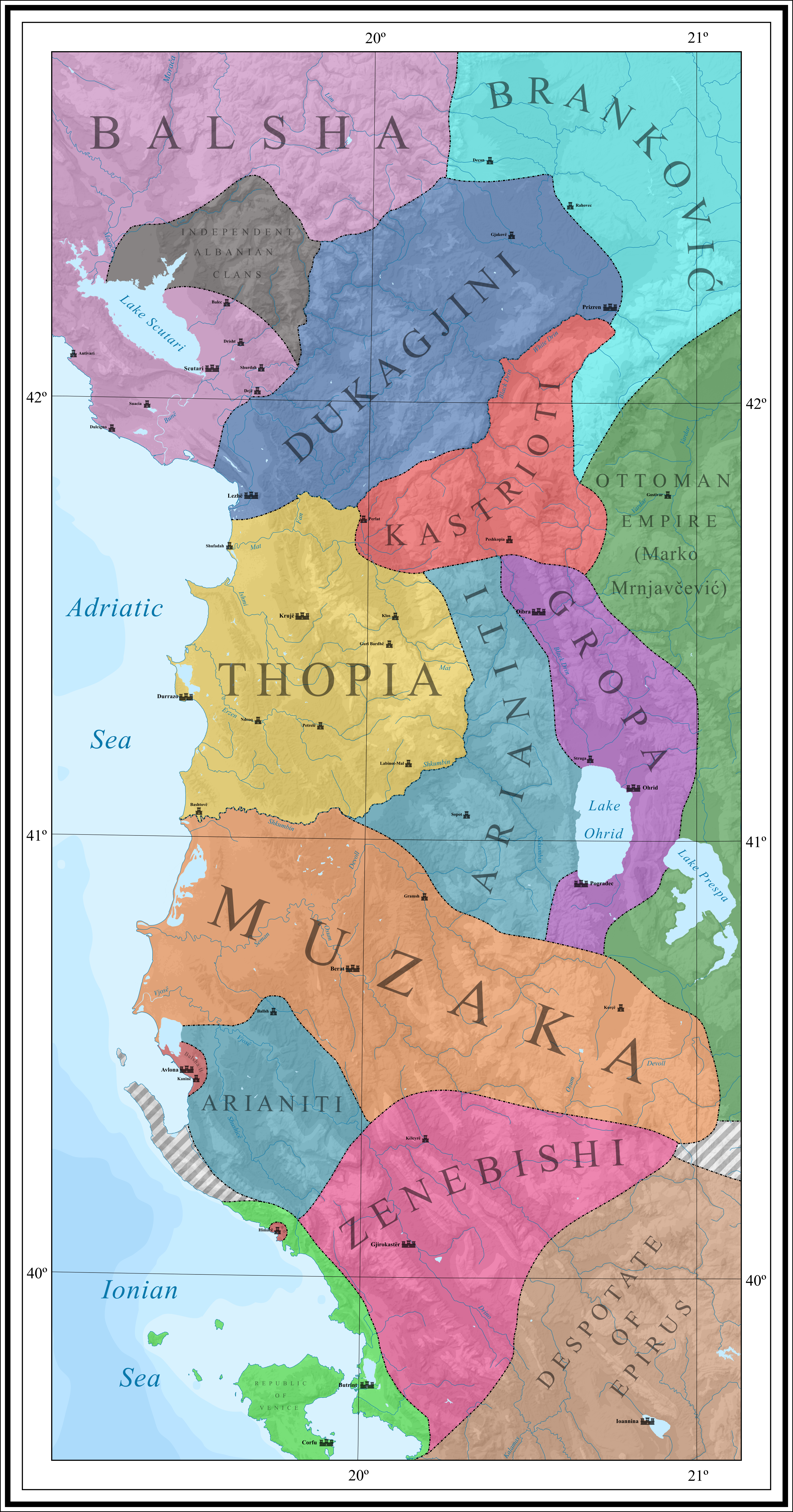
- Lands of the Muzaka and Arianiti families in the 14th century
- Status: Principality, Despotate
- Capital: Berat
- Common languages: Albanian
- Religion: Eastern Orthodoxy
- Prince/Despot
  - 1279-1319: Andrea I
  - 1319–1331: Teodor I
  - 1331–1372: Andrea II
  - 1372–1389: Teodor II
  - 1389-1450: Teodor III
- Historical era: Medieval
  - Establishment: 1279
  - Serbian capture: 1343
  - Independence and height of power: 1372
  - First Ottoman capture: 1417
  - Revolt: 1437–38
  - League of Lezhë: 1444
  - Second Ottoman capture and dissolution: 1450
Preceded by	Succeeded by
Kingdom of Albania	Sanjak of Albania
- Today part of: Albania; North Macedonia; Greece

The Principality of Muzaka (Albanian: Principata e Muzakajve), also known as the Lordship of Berat, was an independent realm ruled by the Albanian Muzaka family with its capital at Berat, covering territories in Central and Southern Albania, Western Macedonia and Northern Greece. The principality was established in 1279 and fell to the Ottomans in 1450.

Their first ruler was Andrea I Muzaka who was awarded the title of Sebastokrator by the Byzantine Empire. He also took part in a revolt against the Kingdom of Serbia which ended in failure. The powee and influence of the Principality of Muzaka culminated under the rule of Andrea II. During the expansion of the Serbian Empire under Stefan Dušan in 1343, the Serbian forces captured Berat. Due to this, Andrea II had to submit to Dušan, however some sources state that his realm was fully conquered. Nevertheless in 1350, under Andrea II, the Muzaka sprung into a revolt against the Serbian Empire. By 1372 they achieved independence and their lands stretched from the Adriatic Sea to Korçë, and from the Devoll river to the Vjosa river. After the death of Andrea II, the principality would suffer a slow decline, which was bolstered by Ottoman incursions. The Ottomans conquered the lands of the Muzaka during a campaign between 1415–17. Teodor III Muzaka would attempt to reform the principality, and would even rebel against the Ottomans between 1437–38, however his attempts would end in failure, but despite this the Muzaka continued to have some governance in Berat. Teodor III and other members of the Muzaka family would take part in the League of Lezhë on 2 March 1444, after which they would declare independence from the Ottomans. The Principality of Muzaka would exist for another 6 years before being dissolved after the death of Teodor III and the Ottoman attack on Berat in 1450. The Muzaka family would keep governing Berat under the League of Lezhë until 1455 when the city was captured by the Ottomans after being besieged.

The principality also had considerable influence in the politics of medieval Albania. This was achieved through political marriages with other noble families and alliances with the Angevins, Gropa and Balšić. The Muzaka also possessed significant wealth, a big percentage of which was in the form of real estate in Durrës.

== History ==
=== Early history ===
The earliest traceable ancestor of the Muzaka family is Lal Muzaka, a peasant from Opar. The earliest mention of the Muzaka comes during the 11th–12th centuries by Byzantine historian Anna Komnenos, who mentions an unnamed Muzaka noble who in 1090 was a general of Alexios I Komnenos. Another early Muzaka Noblemen was Gjon I Muzaka, who was captured as a prisoner of war by the Anjou in 1279. He would be kept in Brindisi before being released by Charles I of Anjou with the promise of not attacking the Angevin possessions.

=== Rule of Andrea I ===
The Principality of Muzaka was formed under the rule of Andrea I Muzaka in 1279. Andrea I controlled the ancestral Muzaka lands of Myzeqe, and would also become the first to rule Berat, establishing de-facto independent rule over it. He would also be given the title of Sebastokrator by Byzantine Emperor Andronikos II Palaiologos and would also be named Marshal of the Kingdom of Albania. Initially beginning as a vassal to the Angevin Kingdom of Albania, Andrea I would achieve independence and besides Berat and Myzeqe, his domains would expand to include parts of Devoll, Skrapar, Opar, Tomorrica, Selenicë and Korça.

In 1319, the Principality of Muzaka under the rule of Andrea I would organize an Albanian uprising against the Kingdom of Serbia. The revolt was kickstarted by Philip II and Pope John XXII with the goal of organizing an Anti-Serbian crusade. The uprising ultimately failed and Andrea I died the same year.

=== Rule of Andrea II ===
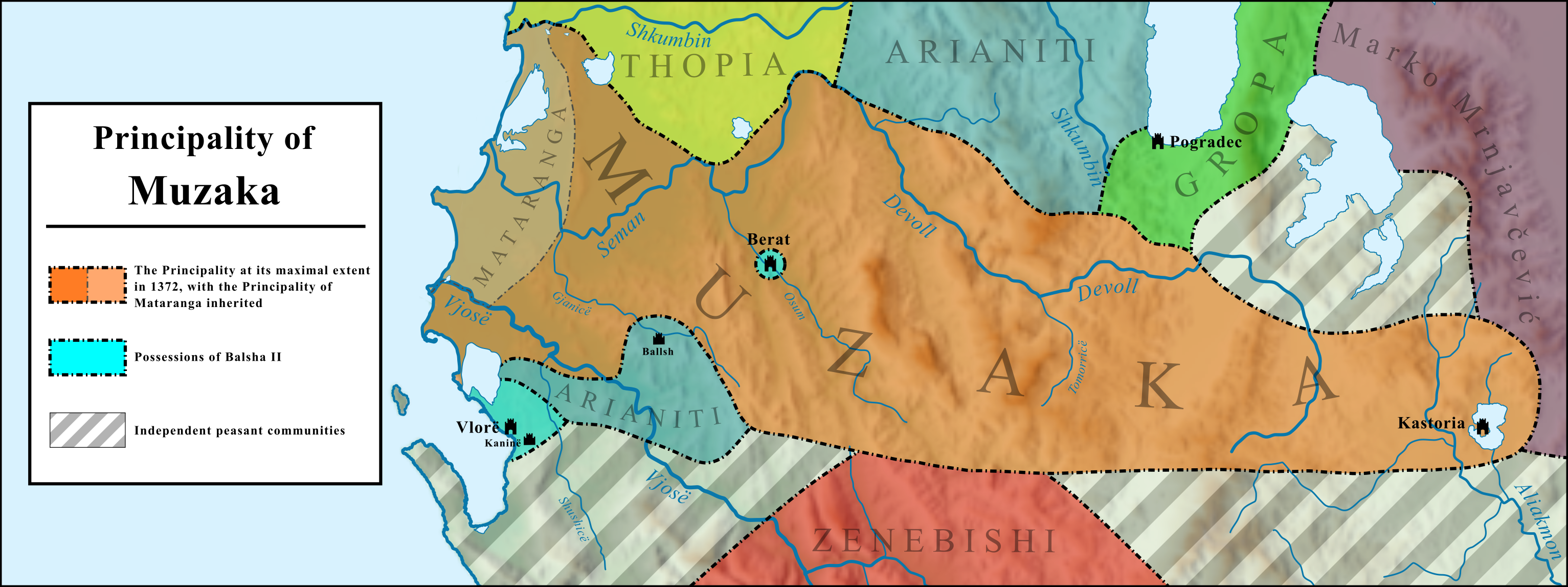
The Principality of Muzaka in 1372, after the death of Andrea II.

After the death of Andrea I, the Principality passed to his son Teodor I Muzaka. After the death of Teodor I in 1331, the Principality passed to his son Andrea II Muzaka. Andrea II ruled from 1331 to his death in 1372. Under his rule, the Principality gained full sovereignty and reached the preak of its power. In 1343 Andrea II lost Berat to Stefan Dušan and thus the Muzaka would succumb to the Serbian Empire, however it is not known if the Principality of Muzaka was fully invaded or if it submitted to Dušan. During 1350–1372, Andrea II would start a revolt against the Serbians which would ultimately lead to him recapturing the lost lands of the Principality of Muzaka. He captured Berat in 1350 and Myzeqe some time later, Korça and Devoll in 1355, Vlorë and Kaninë in 1363 and Kastoria in 1370. He would also defeat the Serbian army twice in Pelister, during 1369/70 and 1370/72, which would lead to him being awarded the title of Despot by John V Palaiologos. He would also capture the Castle of Bregu, Gosa and Garunja from Blasius Mataranga in the 1360's, leading him into direct confrontation with Karl Thopia. By the time of Andrea II's death in 1372, the Principality of Muzaka included much of Myzeqe, Berat, Tomorricë, Skrapar, Këlcyrë, Përmet, Opar, Devoll, Kolonjë and Kastoria. His lands stretched from the Adriatic Sea in the west to Korça in the east and from the Vjosa river in the south to the Devoll river in the north.

=== Decline ===
The death of Andrea II marked the start of the downfall of the Principality of Muzaka. After his death, the lands of the principality were split between his three sons, Teodor II, Stoya and Gjin I. Gjin I inherited much of the lands of his father. The center of his state was Tomorricë. Stoya became lord of Kastoria, however after his death it would be taken by Gjin I. Teodor II became lord of Myzeqe and Berat. Bregu, Gosa and Garunja were captured by Karl Thopia. After the Battle of Savra in 1385 between Karl Thopia and Balša II, the Ottomans, who were allied with the Thopia in the battle, captured Berat, Krujë, Ulcinj and Kastoria. Although they withdrew from Krujë, Ulcinj and Berat, the Ottomans remained in Kastoria. However some sources state that after capturing Berat from Teodor II, the Ottomans stayed there to use it as an outpost for invading Vlorë. Teodor II would later die fighting the Ottomans in 1389 at the Battle of Kosovo. After his death the Ottomans recaptured Berat, which would be liberated by the Muzaka in 1396. The Principality of Muzaka would pass to Teodor III in the same year. Teodor III took part in several campaigns against Prince Marko, and in late 1411 would defeat Niketa Thopia in battle, capturing the noble as a prisoner of war. He would only be released in 1413 after the Republic of Ragusa ceded several territories on the banks of the Shkumbin river to the Muzaka.

==== Ottoman invasions ====
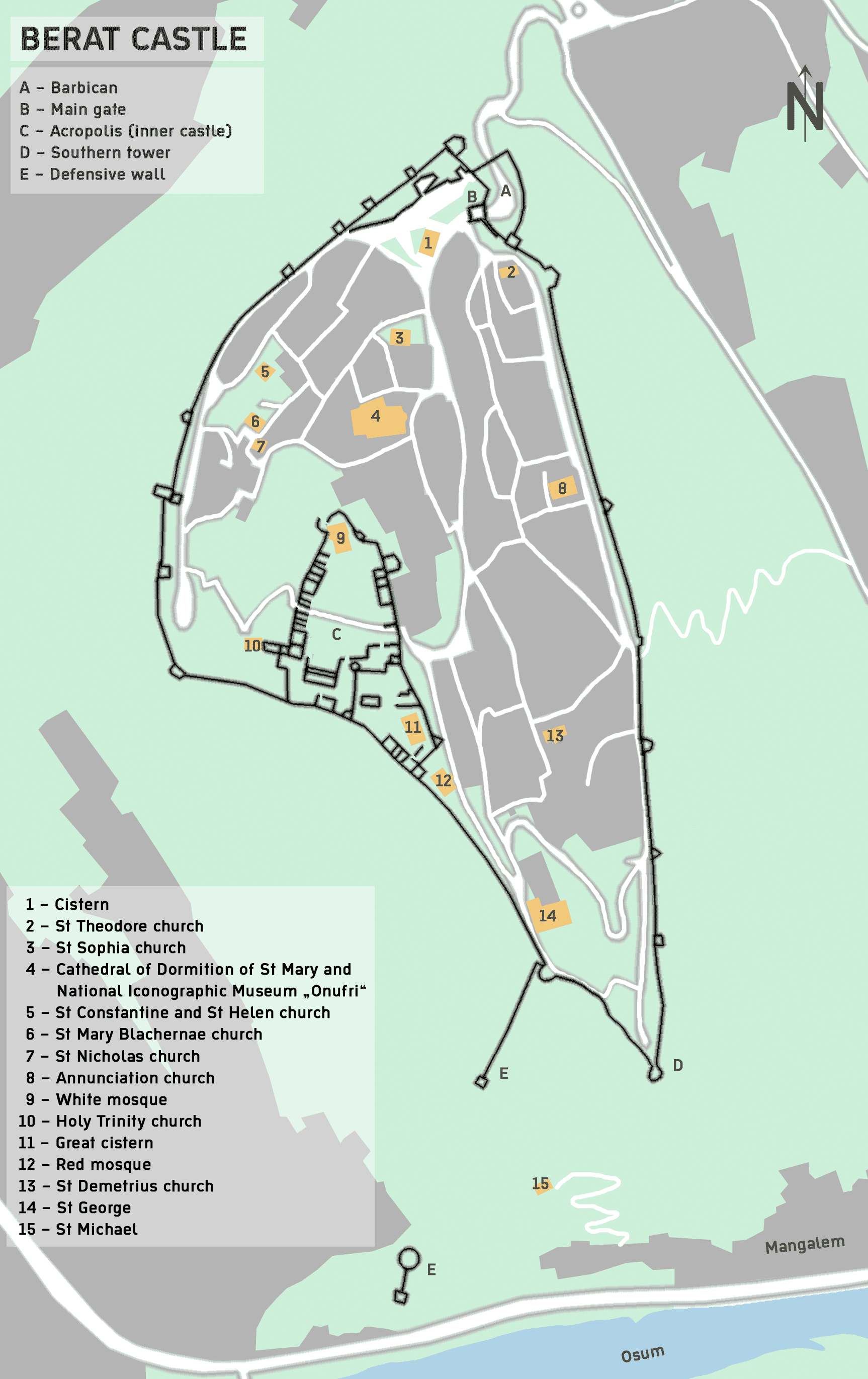
Map of Berat Castle

The Ottomans started a conquest of the Principality of Muzaka in 1415. In 1417 they captured Vlorë and Berat. During 1437–1438, Teodor III led an uprising in the region of Berat, however similarly to the Albanian revolt of 1432-1436, it was suppressed. In 1444, the Muzaka joined the League of Lezhë. Teodor III continued to govern Berat, however in 1449 he would fall seriously ill. In the name of the league, Teodor III sent for Skanderbeg to take Berat after his death. Skanderbeg sent a contingent of 500 soldiers commanded by Pal Kuka to capture the castle, however in 1450 the Ottomans scaled the castle, killing the soldiers and hanging a dying Teodor. This led to the dissolution of the Principality of Muzaka. Despite this, Berat remained under the hands of Skanderbeg. The Muzaka, under Karl Muzakë Thopia continued to govern Berat until it was captured in 1455 after being besieged by the Ottomans.

== Politics and Influence ==
=== Angevin Alliance and property in Durrës ===
Sometime before 1335, Andrea II was recognised with the title of Despot by the Byzantines, who still ruled over most Albanian territories despite the increasing independence of local Albanian rulers. During the years of 1335-1341, Andrea II led a revolt against the Byzantines in southern Albania. Andrea II had simultaneously allied himself with the Angevins of Naples, signing an agreement with Louis, the nephew of King Robert, on 30 December 1336. As part of this agreement, Andrea II swore fealty to the Neapolitan king, who in turn confirmed Andrea II’s titles and his right to rule over the lands granted to him by the Byzantines. Additionally, one of his sons was to be kept as a royal hostage by the Angevins in Durrës. Also, as part of this agreement, members of the Muzaka family were allowed to travel freely to and from Angevin-controlled Durrës, and the friendly ties between the two noble families remained up until the Muzaka family fled from the Ottoman conquest of Albania. Andrea II also had noticeable influence in the city of Durrës, where he exercised his right to freely travel to the city and conduct business, as well as owning real estate in the city which made up a significant percentage of his wealth.

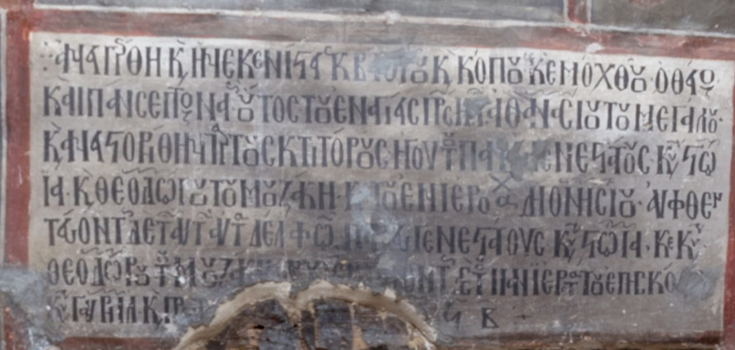
An inscription from the Church of St. Athanasius of Mouzaki mentioning Stoya and his brother Teodor II Muzaka as the founders of the church.

=== Religious Foundations ===
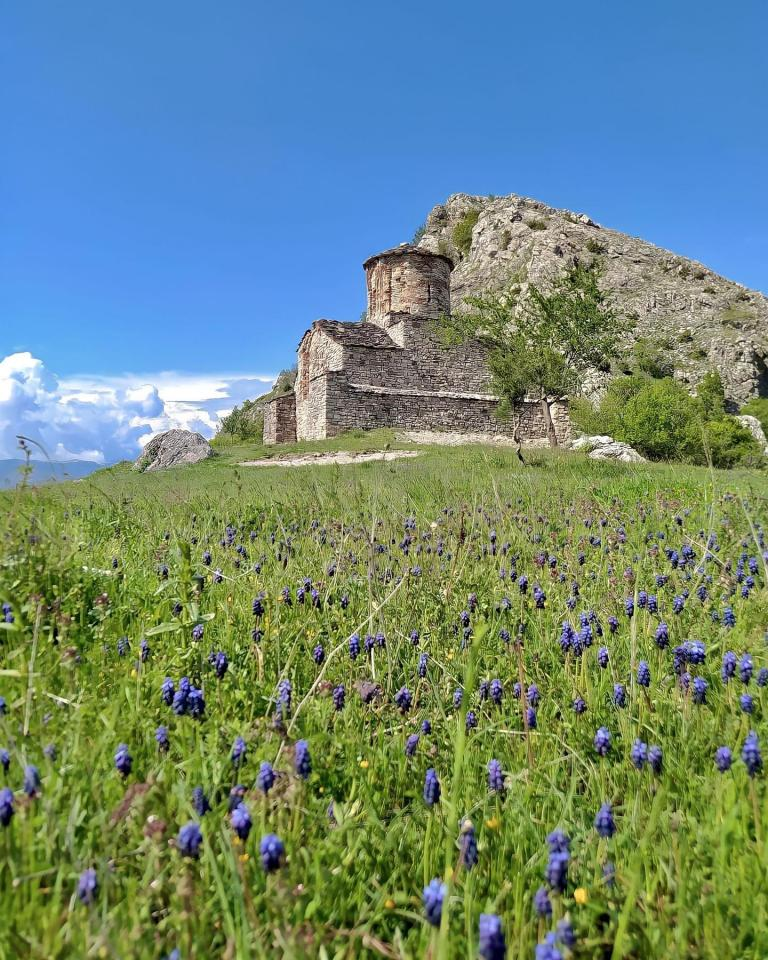
Church of the Holy Trinity in Lavdar Albania built by Albanian noblewoman Chiranna Zenevisi

Rulers of the Muzaka had also made significant religious constructions. In Kastoria (modern-day Greece), the two brothers, Teodor II and Stoya, had constructed the Church of St. Athanasius of Mouzaki after their father Andrea II conquered Kastoria from the Serbian King Marko Mrnjavcevic.

Another notable construction was the Holy Trinity Church of Lavdar, which was built in 1470 by Chiranna Zenevisi, the consort of the principality, and her husband Andrea III Muzaka. Gjin II Muzaka also built the Saint Mary church in Bungë (English: Sessile oak forest) near the village Zerec, few km from Lavdar. He was buried by this church, as were his wife and his mother Chiranna. In the same fashion, their descendants built another church dedicated to Saint George in the nearby Arostë (Erosto).

=== Political Marriages ===
To extend the influence of the principality, a series of political marriages occurred between the Muzaka and other influential Albanian families. Teodor I Muzaka had married a daughter of “Paul of Ohrid” whom historians consider to may have been the Albanian noble Pal Gropa. Another marriage occurred with the Gropa family between Chiranna Muzaka and Andrea Gropa. According to the Albanian chronicler Gjon Muzaka, after the death of Andrea Gropa, he had left no heirs, thus his domains became annexed by the Muzaka principality through the rights of his widow, Chiranna. Another marriage occurred between Comita Muzaka and Balša II. After the death of Andrea II, Balša II would inherit Vlorë and Kaninë from his father-in-law. Other marriages between different noble families have occurred with the Arianiti, Dukagjini, Mataranga and the Zenebishi.

== List of monarchs ==
Picture	^{Title}Name	Reign	Notes
	^{Sebastokrator and Marshal of Albania} Andrea I Muzaka	1279–1319	Received the title Sebastokrator by the Byzantine Emperor and his reign was de facto independent until 1319.
	^{Protosebastus} Teodor I Muzaka	1319–1331	Son of Andrea I Muzaka
	^{Despot of Albania} Andrea II Muzaka	1331–1372	Andrea II, much like his father, fulfilled the role of the Angevins' titular marshal in Albania. Apart from being acknowledged as despotus Regni Albaniae (the despot of the Kingdom of Albania) and Marshal of Albania by the Angevins, he also held several other titles, including sebastokrator.
	^{Prince of Berat} Teodor II Muzaka	1372–1389	Son of Andrea II. Participated in the Battle of Kosovo. Teodor II was in territorial dispute over Kostur with Prince Marko and because this dispute he was commemorated in Serbian epic poetry as Musa Kesedžija.
	^{Lord of Berat} Teodor III Muzaka	1396–1450	He was an Albanian nobleman who led the 1437–38 revolt against the Ottomans and was one of the founders of the League of Lezhë in 1444.

== See also ==
- Muzaka family
- Church of St Athanasius of Mouzaki
- Albanian principalities
- History of Albania

== Sources ==
- Anamali, Skënder (2002). Historiae Popullit Shqiptar (in Albanian). Tirana. OCLC 52411919.
- Sainty, Guy Stair (2018). The Constantinian Order of Saint George and the Angeli, Farnese and Bourbon families which governed it. Boletín Oficial del Estado. ISBN 978-8-4340-2506-6.
- Elsie, Robert (2003). Early Albania: A Reader of Historical Texts, 11th–17th Centuries. Otto Harrassowitz Verlag. ISBN 978-3-447-04783-8.
- Pitcher, Donald Edgar (1968). An Historical Geography of the Ottoman Empire: From Earliest Times to the End of the Sixteenth Century. Brill Archive. GGKEY:4CFA3RCNXRP.
- Gibbons, Herbert Adam (2013). The Foundation of the Ottoman Empire: A History of the Osmanlis Up To the Death of Bayezid I 1300-1403. Routledge. ISBN 978-1-135-02982-1.
- Kiel, Machiel (1990). Ottoman architecture in Albania, 1385-1912. Research Centre for Islamic History, Art and Culture. ISBN 978-92-9063-330-3.
- Frashëri, Kristo (1964). The history of Albania: a brief survey.
- Noli, Fan S. (1947). George Castrioti Scanderbeg (1405–1468). New York: International Universities Press. OCLC 732882.
- Hodgkinson, Harry (1999). Scanderbeg: From Ottoman Captive to Albanian Hero.
- Fine, John V. A. (1994). The Late Medieval Balkans: A Critical Survey from the Late Twelfth Century to the Ottoman Conquest. University of Michigan Press. ISBN 0-472-08260-4.
- Gjergji, Andromaqi (2004). Albanian costumes through the centuries: origin, types, evolution. Acad. of Sciences of Albania, Inst. of Folc Culture. ISBN 9789994361441.
- Facaros, Dana; Theodorou, Linda (2003). Greece. New Holland Publishers. ISBN 1-86011-898-4.
- Tase, Pirro (1873). Te Huajt Per Shqiperine Dhe Shqiptaret. Press, Incorporated. ISBN 978-0-557-33253-3.
- Braudel, Fernand (1995). The Mediterranean and the Mediterranean world in the age of Philip II, Volume 2. University of California Press. ISBN 0-520-20330-5.
