= Chiranna Muzaka =

Medieval Albanian noblewoman of the Muzaka family

Chiranna Muzaka Kirana Muzaka
- Lady of Ohrid
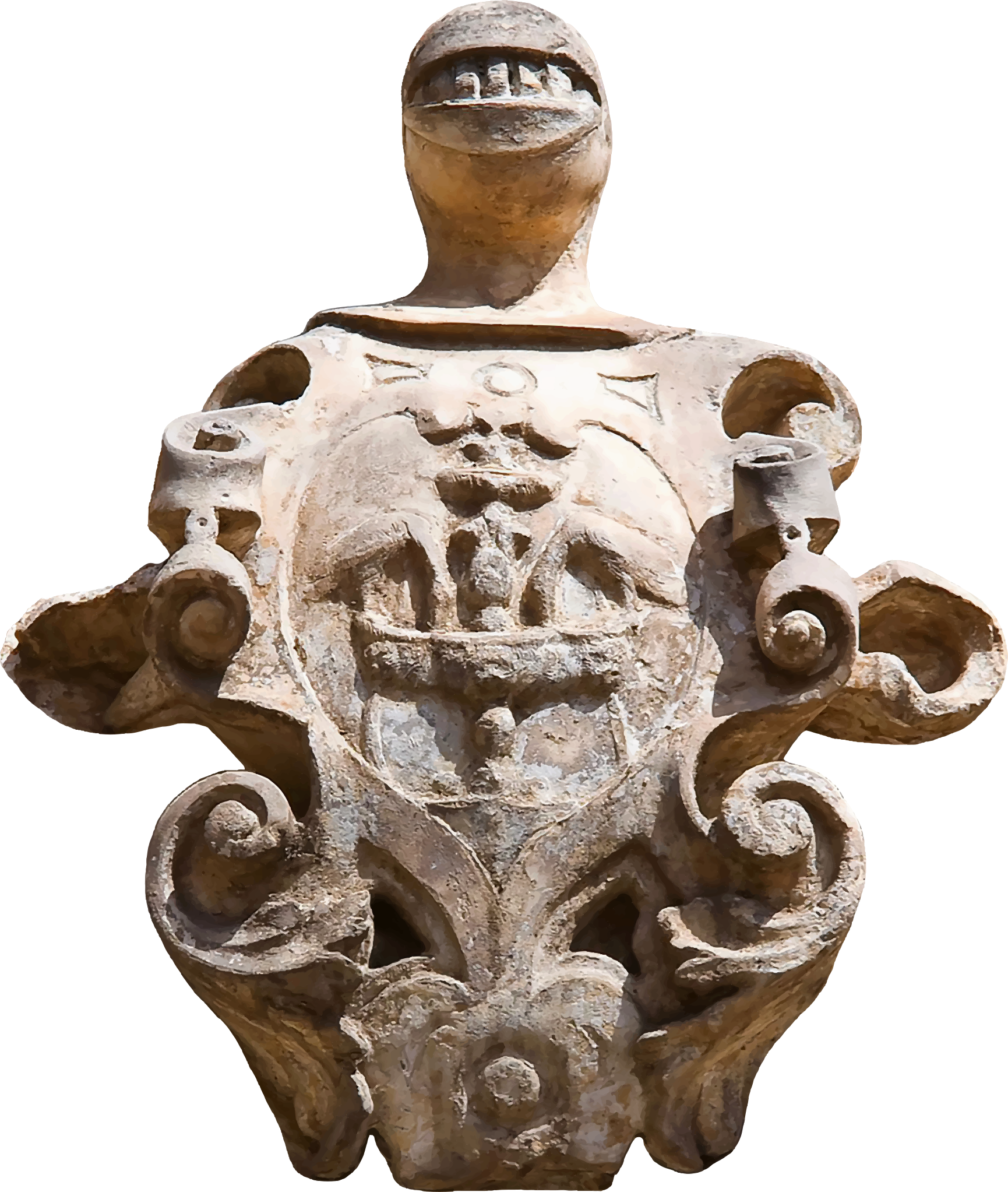
- Coat of Arms of the Muzaka family

Lady of Ohrid
- Tenure: 1371-1380
- Born: 14th century
- Spouse: Andrea Gropa
- House: Muzaka
- Father: Andrea II Muzaka
- Mother: Euphemia Mataranga
- Religion: Eastern Orthodox

Chiranna Muzaka (Albanian: Kirana Muzaka), also known as Kyranna or Anne, was an Albanian princess and member of the Muzaka family.

== Life ==
Chiranna was the daughter of Andrea II Muzaka who held the title Despot of Albania & Epirus and Sebastokrator from the noble Muzaka family, and Euphemia Mataranga from the noble Mataranga family. She was the youngest of five siblings. Little is known about her early life.

Chiranna was married to Andrea Gropa who was the Lord of Ohrid. The couple left no issue, and their property was inherited by the Muzaka family.

== See also ==
- Muzaka family
- Gropa family

== Bibliography ==
- Elsie, Robert (2003). Early Albania A Reader of Historical Texts, 11th-17th Centuries. Harrassowitz. ISBN 978-3-4470-4783-8.
- Soulis, George Christos (1984). The Serbs and Byzantium During the Reign of Tsar Stephen Dušan (1331-1355) and His Successors. Dumbarton Oaks Library and Collection. ISBN 978-0-8840-2137-7.
