= Church of St. Athanasius of Mouzaki =

Church in Kastoria, Greece

Church of Saint Athanasius of Mouzaki
- Ναός του Αγίου Αθανασίου του Μουζάκη; Shën Thanasi i Muzakajve
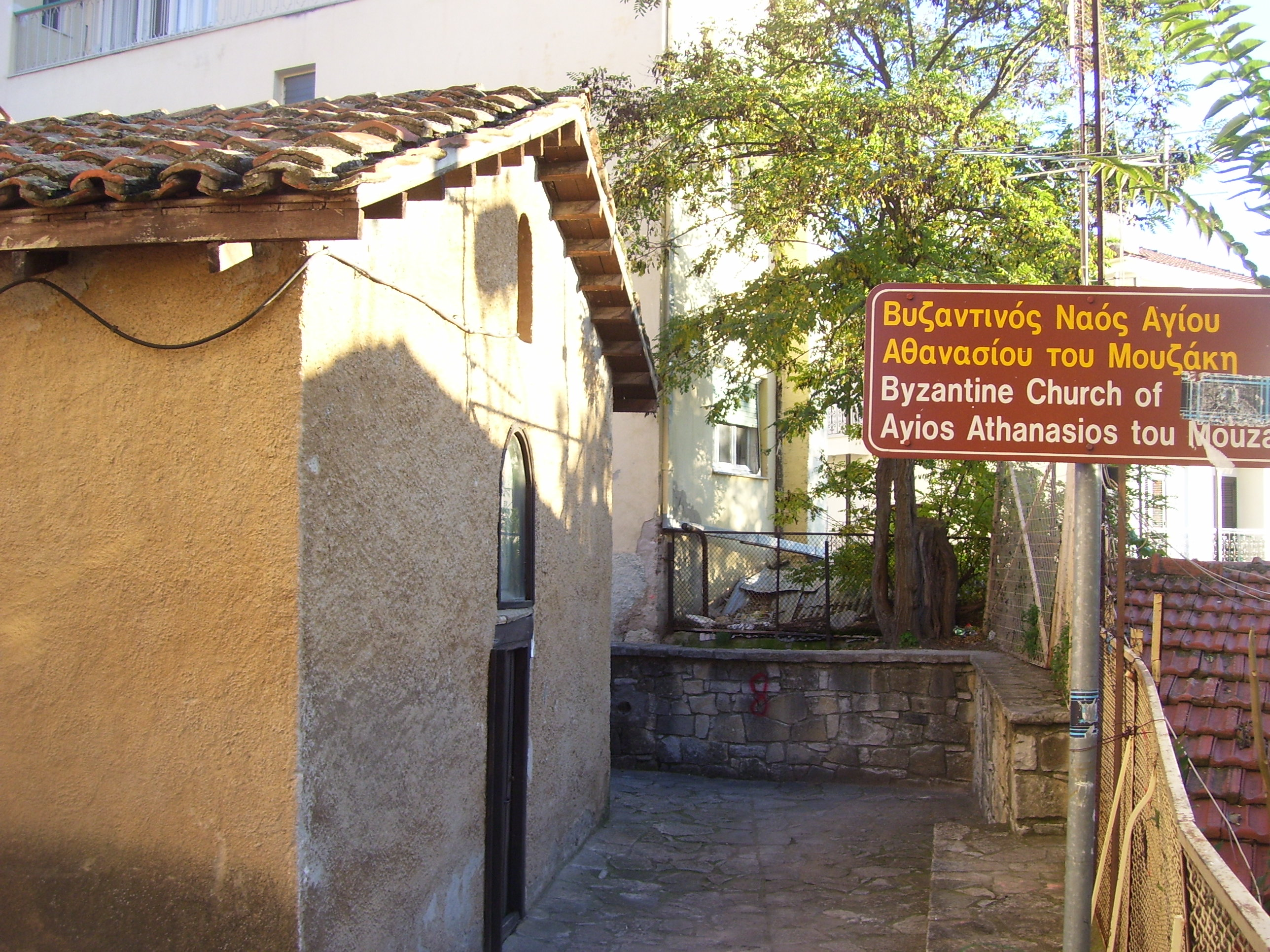
- Church of St. Athanasius of Mouzaki in 2010

Religion
- Affiliation: Eastern Orthodox
- Leadership: Greek Orthodox Church

Location
- Location: Kastoria, Greece
- Interactive map of Church of Saint Athanasius of Mouzaki
- Coordinates: 40.5152°N 21.2672°E

Architecture
- Type: Church
- Style: Byzantine architecture
- Founder: Teodor II Muzaka and Stoya Muzaka
- Completed: 1384

St. Athanasius of Mouzaki (Greek: Άγιος Αθανάσιος του Μουζάκη) is a Greek Orthodox church located in Kastoria, Greece. It was built in 1383–1384 by the brothers Teodor II Muzaka and Stoya Muzaka of the house of Muzaka, a noble Albanian family that controlled the city at the time, and it is dedicated to St. Athanasius. It is considered one of the most important monuments of 14th century Kastoria and is the last church built in Kastoria before its annexation by the Ottoman Empire.

== Decorations ==
The church is decorated with scenes of saints dressed in Byzantine clothing, a typical feature of Byzantine iconography. The frescoes are remarkable for depicting for the first time in Byzantine iconography, Jesus Christ and the Virgin Mary in imperial costume. The depiction of Virgin Mary as a queen is an atypical feature for the Byzantine iconography. Another unusual feature of the church is that, despite the fact that St. Alexander is traditionally not included among the ranks of military saints, the church of St Athanasius of Mouzaki is decorated with a portrait of St. Alexander and St. Mercurios in military clothing. Within the church is also a fresco of Saint George who is painted rather strange and particularly odd in the Byzantine-styled art. He is wearing a mantle and a cloak that has a double-headed eagle with a star in the middle. Exists a theory by Albanian historian Pëllumb Xhufi that the Byzantine emperor John V Palaiologos rewarded to Andrea II Muzaka with Byzantine Double-headed eagle from his victory over Vukašin of Serbia, and that George fresco was about Muzaka. This theory could imply that during the Middle Ages, Andrea was viewed as a great warrior of God by the Albanian people.

== Legacy ==
The church influenced greatly the artistic production of Kastoria and Western Macedonia in the late 14th and early 15th century.

== Gallery ==
Images of the Church
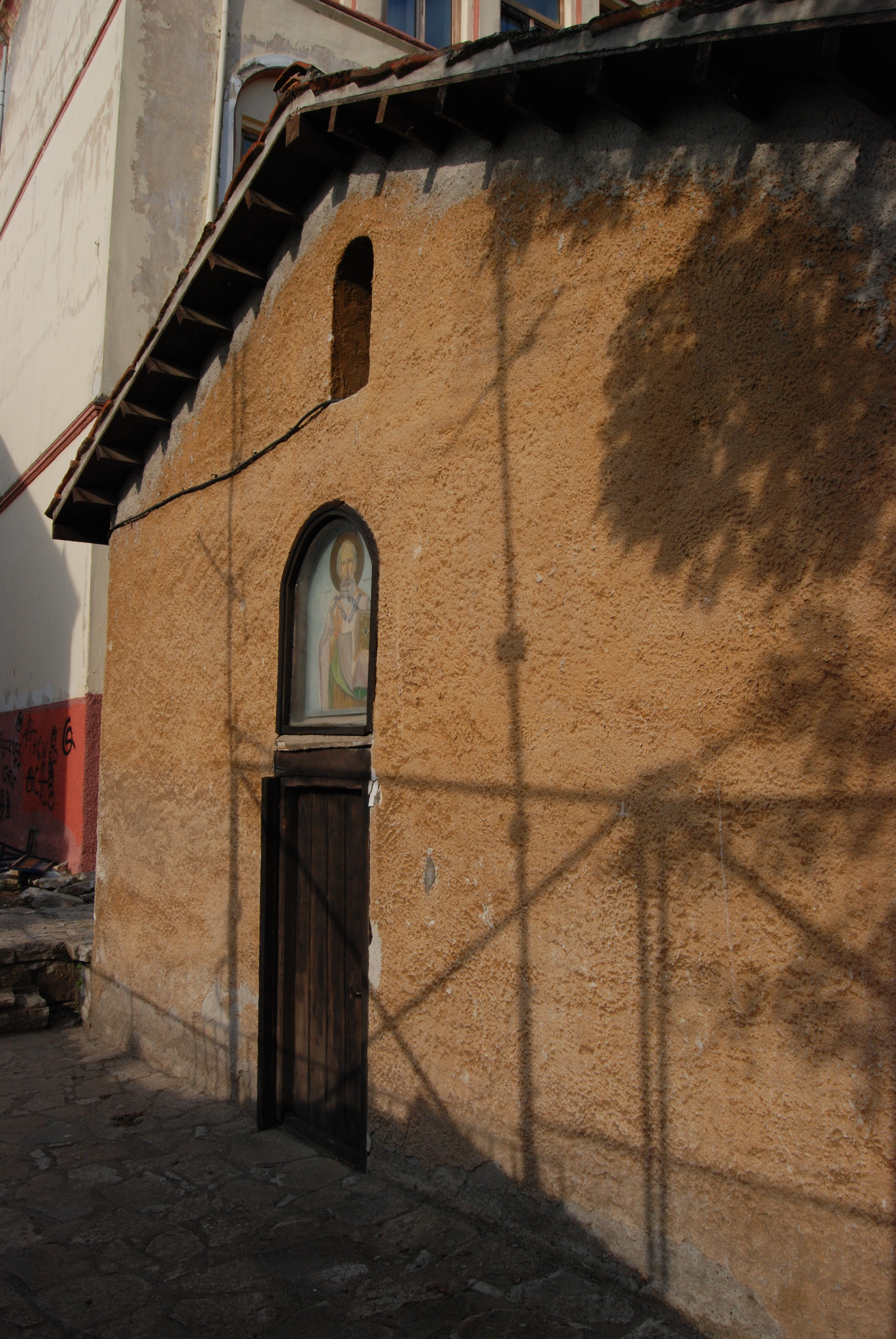
Front view of the Church

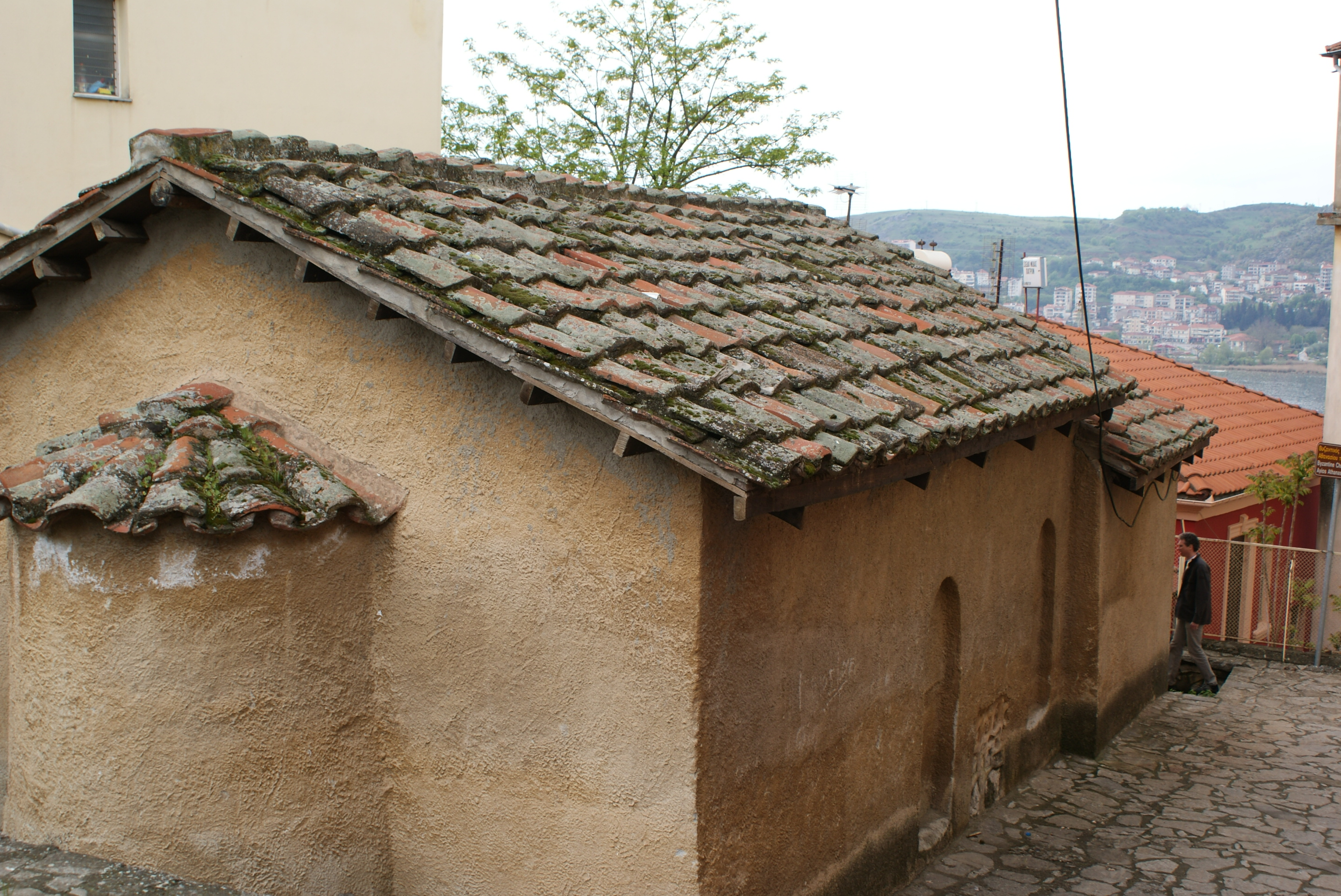
Side view of the Church

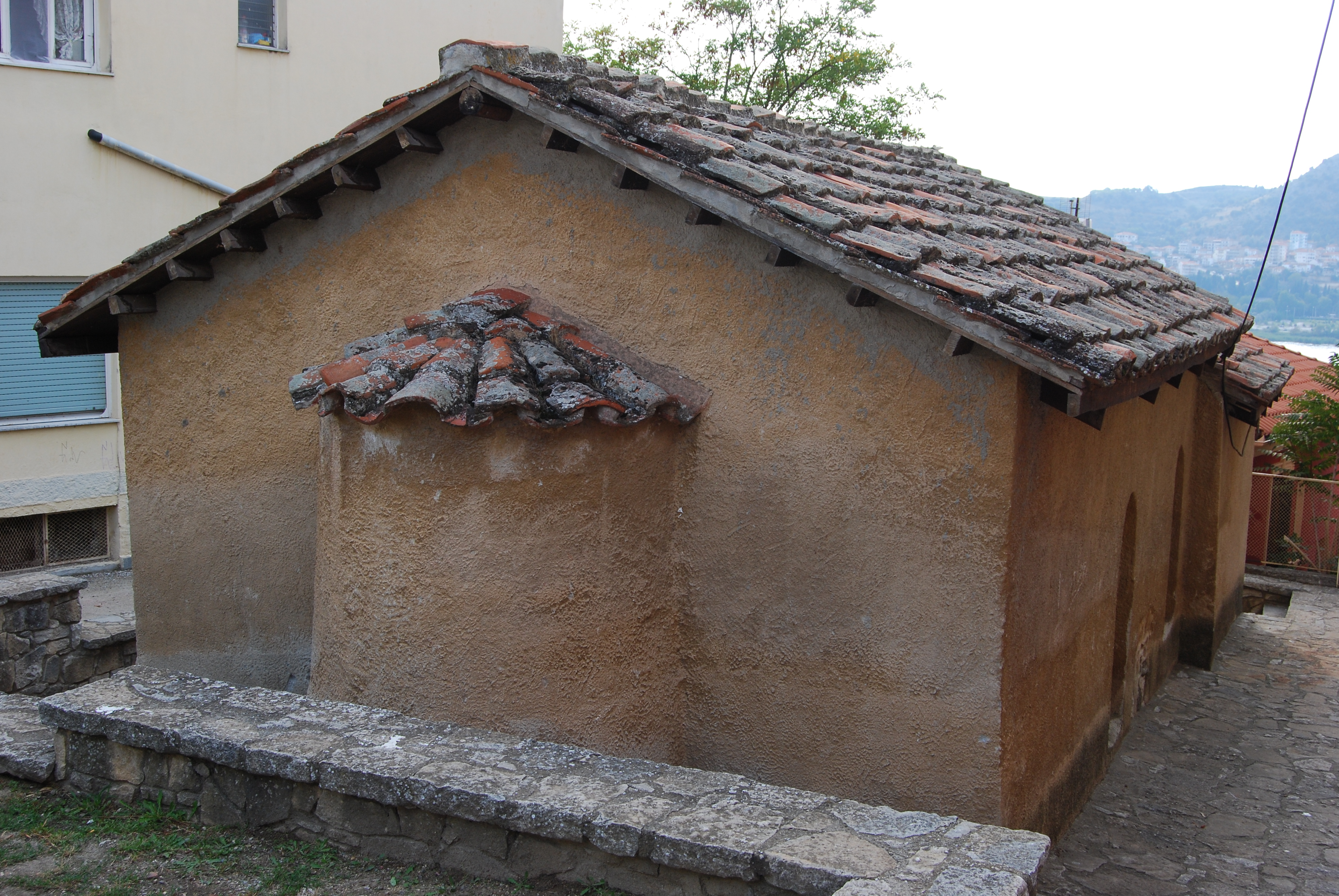
Back view of the Church

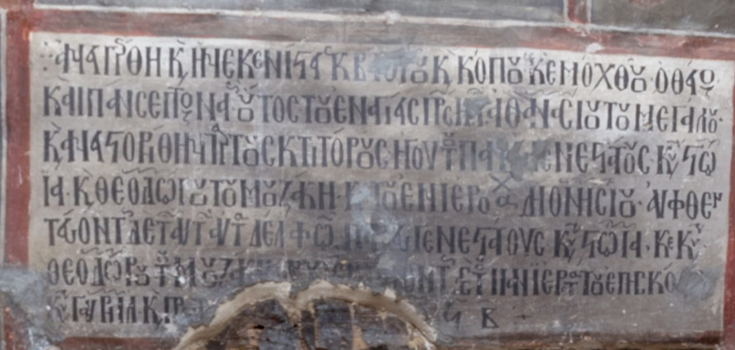
The Founders Inscription with the names of the founders Stoya Muzaka and Teodor II Muzaka

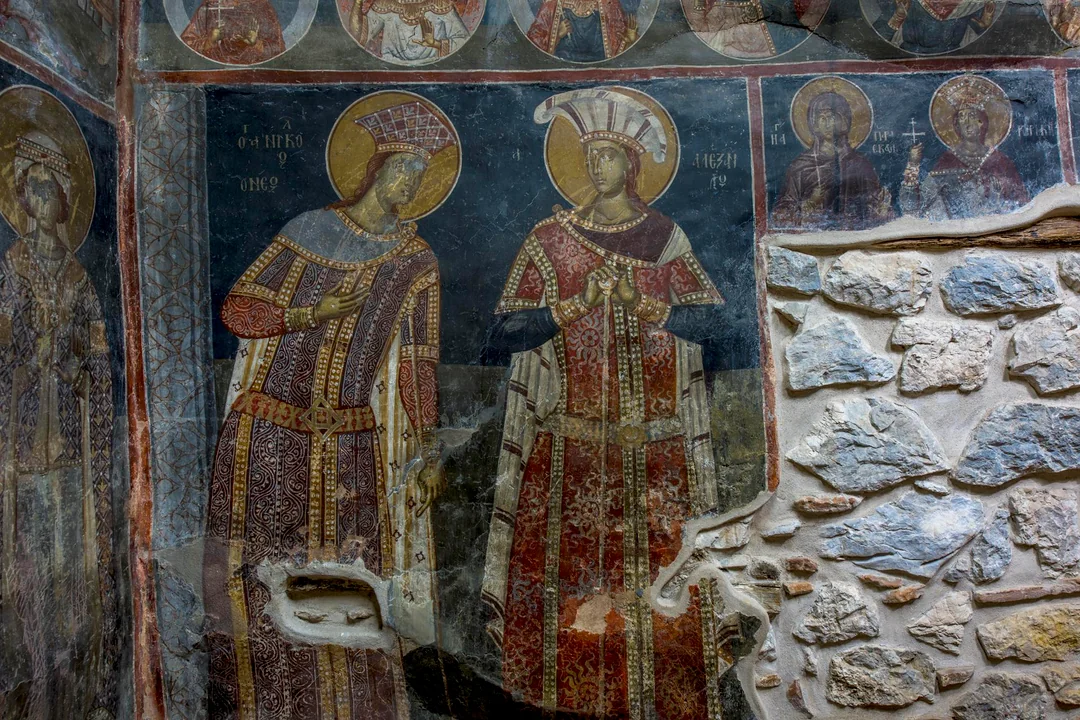
Icons on the wall

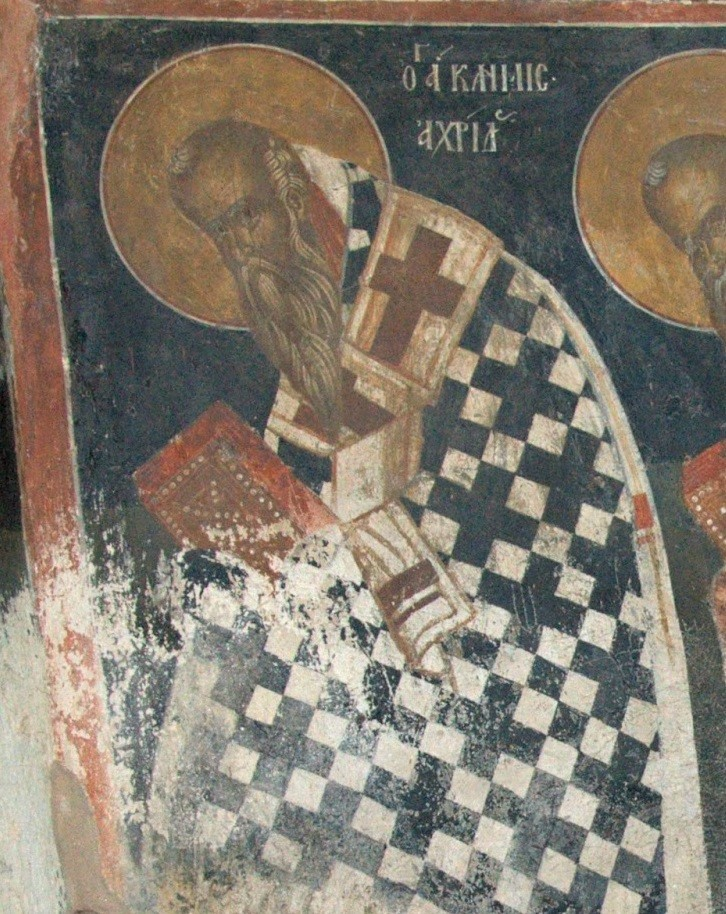
Clement of Ohrid

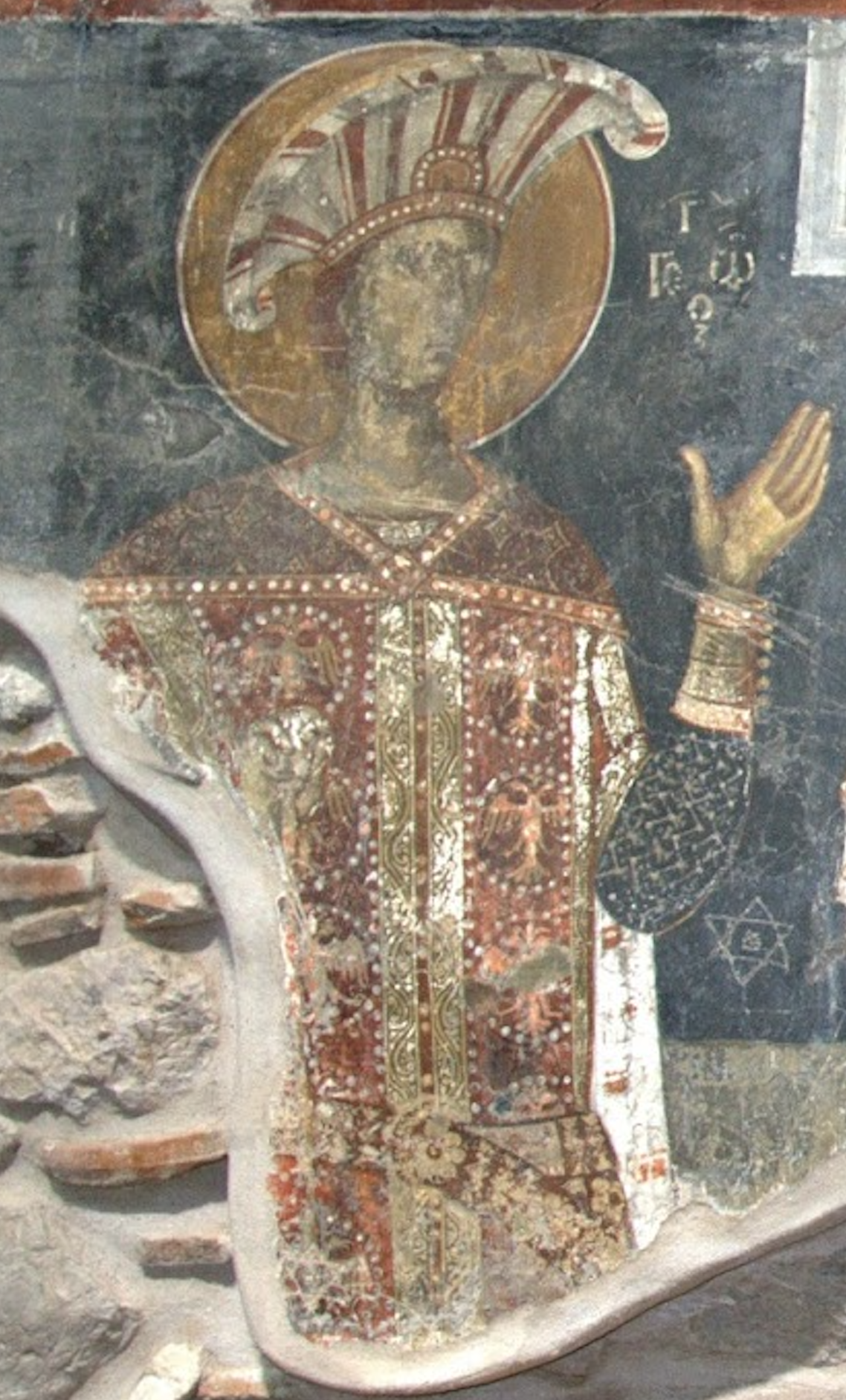
Depiction of Saint George in the church.

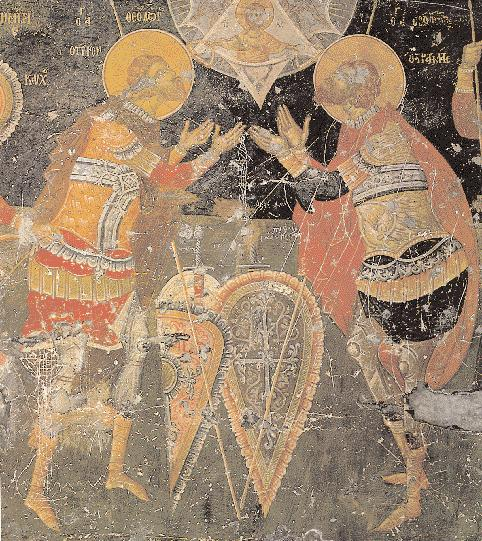
Frescoes of Saints Theodore Tiron and Theodore Stratelates

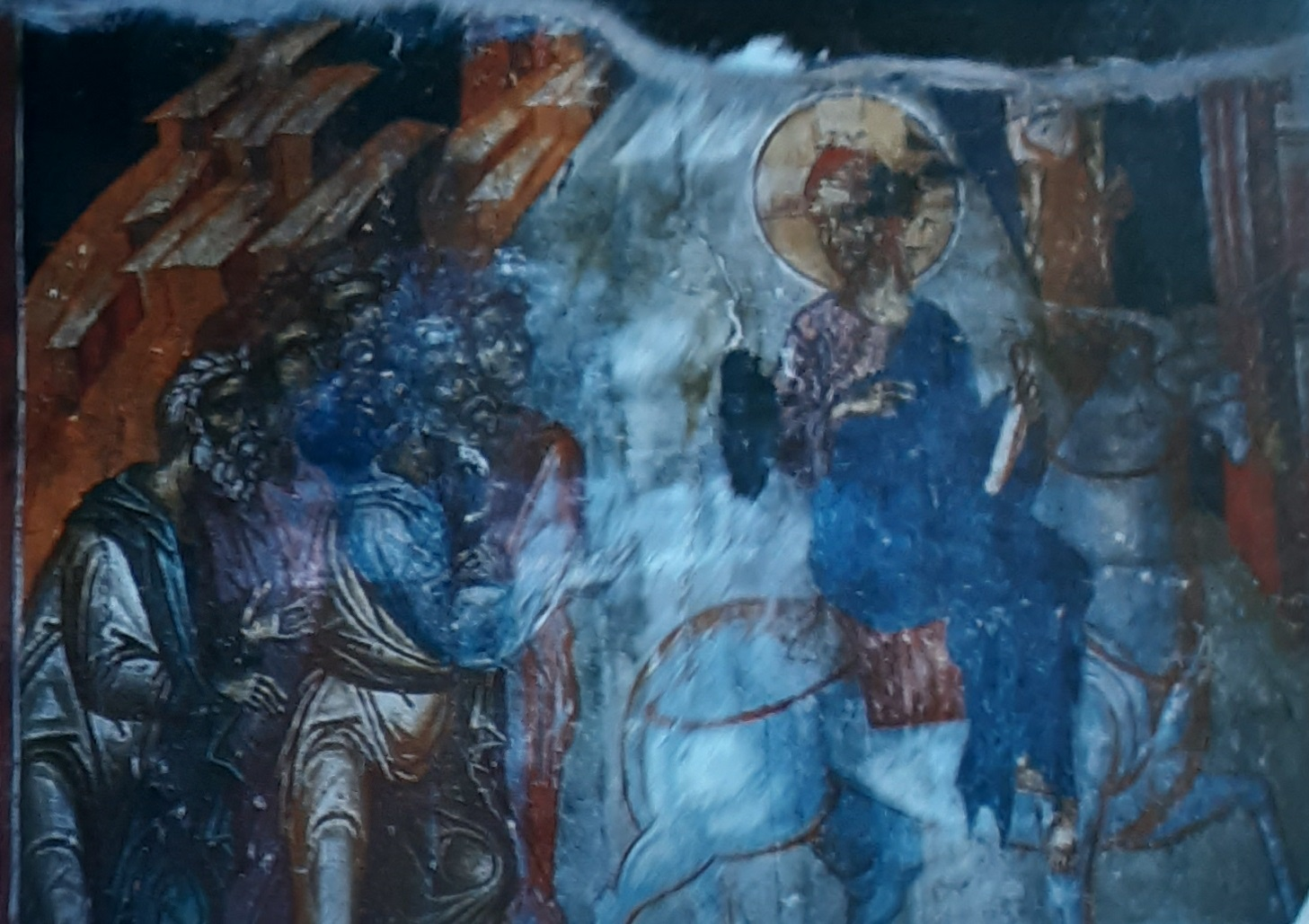
Fresco of the entry of Christ into Jerusalem

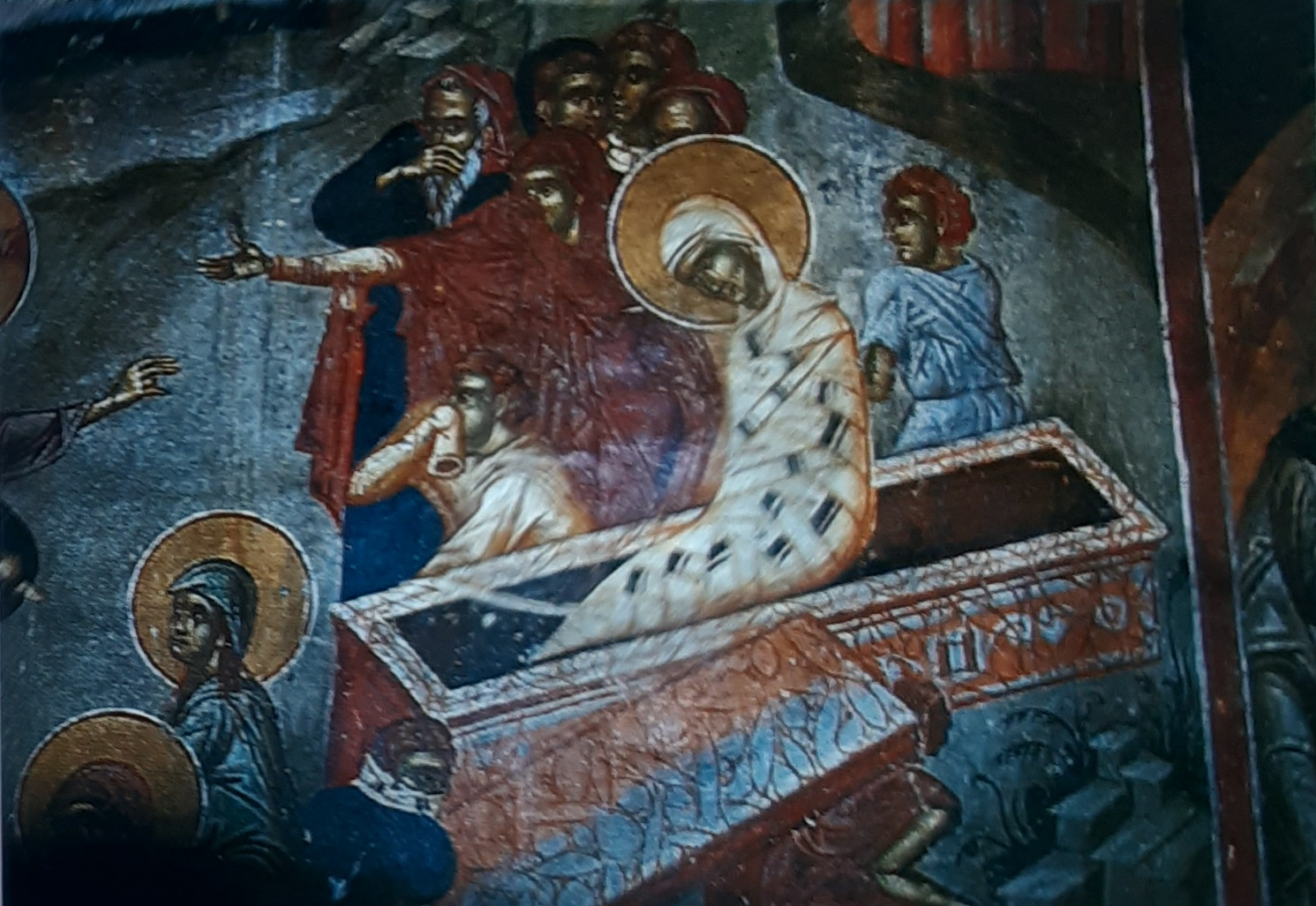
Fresco of the Raising of Lazarus

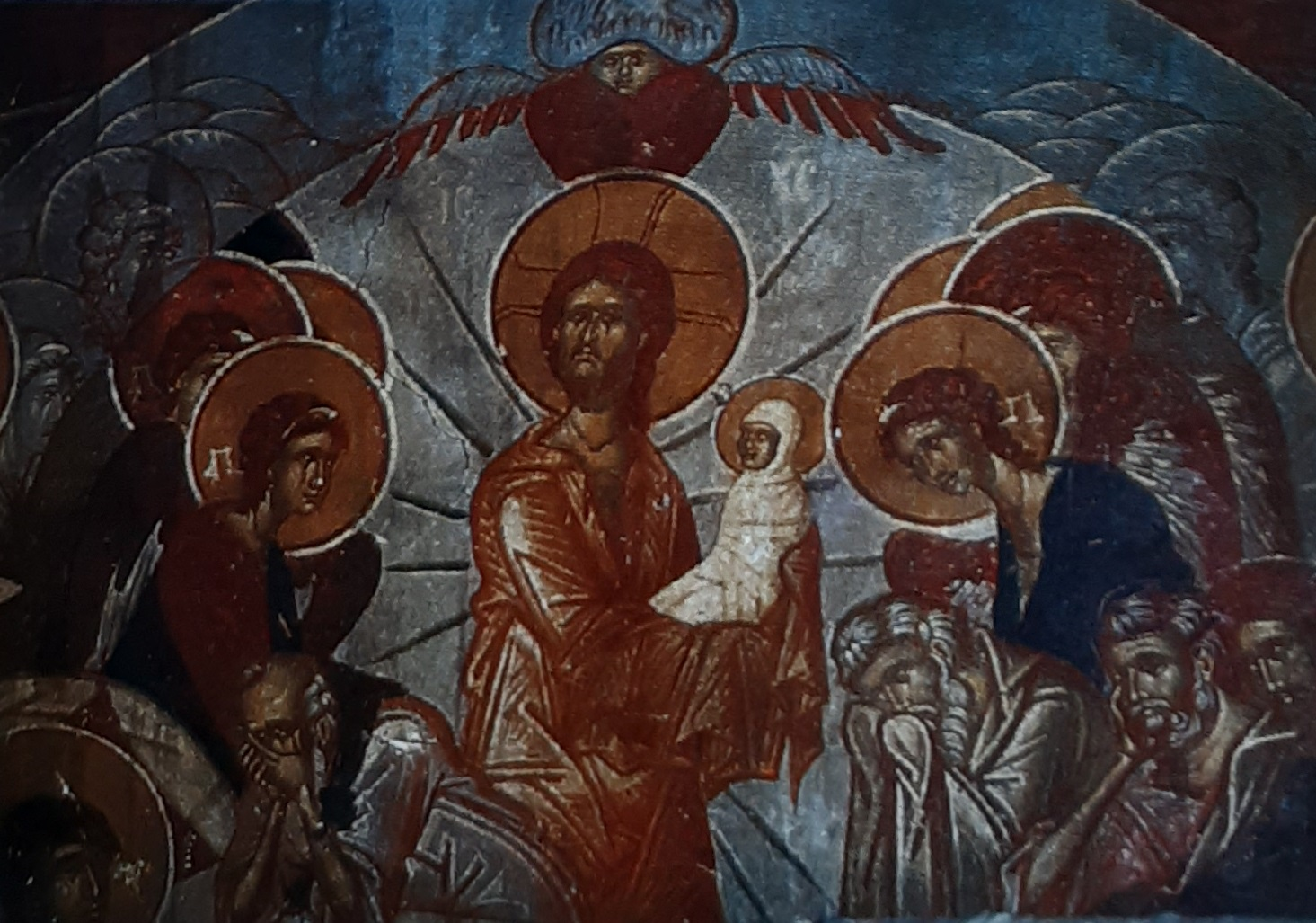
A scene from the church depicting the Dormition of the Mother of God

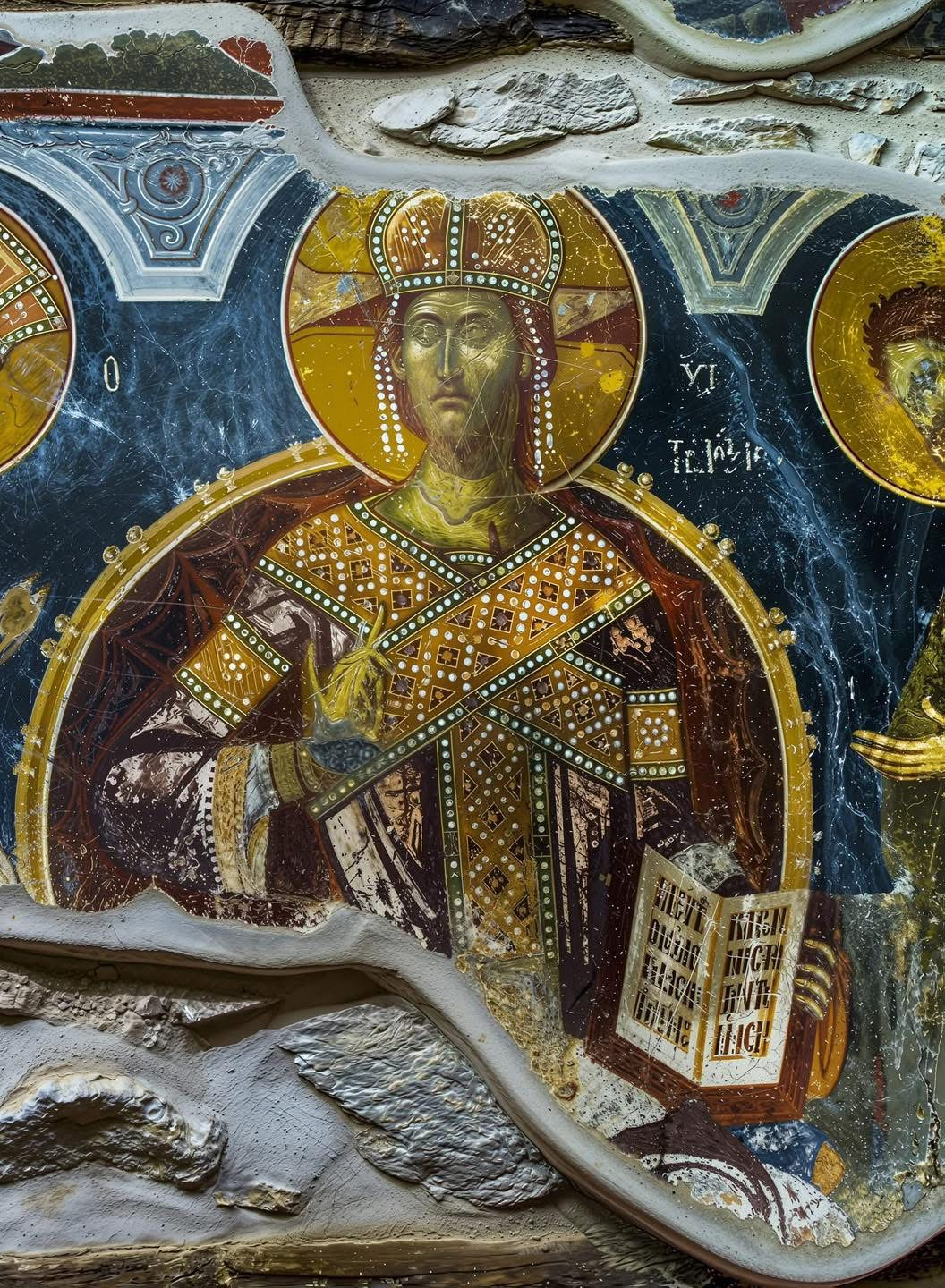
Depiction of Trimorph of Deesis: Jesus in royal Byzantine robes; Next to him is his mother Mary wearing similar robing, John the Baptist, Saint George and an unknow head bearded saint.

== See also ==
- Principality of Muzaka

== Sources ==
- Pazaras (Παζαράς), Nikolaos (Νικόλαος) (2013). "The Frescoes of the Church of Saint Athanasius Mouzakis and their Place in the Context of Monumental Painting in Kastoria and the Surrounding Regions (Kastoria, Upper Macedonia, Northern Epirus . . . Οι τοιχογραφίες του ναού του Αγίου Αθανασίου του Μουζάκη και η ένταξή τους στη μνημειακή ζωγραφική της Καστοριάς και της ευρύτερης περιοχής (Καστοριά, μείζων Μακεδονία, Β. Ήπειρος)". freader.ekt.gr. pp. 560–570. doi:10.12681/eadd/29197.
