= Maliq-Opar =

- Village
- Location within Albania
- Coordinates: 40°37′15″N 20°26′6″E
- Country: Albania
- County: Korçë
- Municipality: Maliq
- Administrative unit: Moglicë
- Time zone: UTC+1 (CET)
  - Summer (DST): UTC+2 (CEST)

Maliq-Opar is a community in the Korçë County, Albania. At the 2015 local government reform, it became part of the municipality Maliq.

== History ==
Maliq-Opar has historical significance as the origin of the medieval Albanian noble family Muzaka, who established a lordship based at Berat. According to the memoirs of Gjon Muzaka, written in the early 16th century, Opar was a village where Albanians fought against Slav and Ottoman invasions and joined the army of the national hero Skanderbeg.

== Culture ==
The masons of the area speak a unique sociolect known as Purishte. This sociolect is part of the cultural identity of the region and reflects the traditional craftsmanship and community bonds of its inhabitants.

== Geography ==
Maliq-Opar is located within the Moglicë administrative unit in the municipality of Maliq. It is situated near the village of Nikollarë and the hamlet of Kucaka (Gurshqipe).
