= Myzeqe =

Largest plain in Western Lowlands of Albania

Coordinates: 40°55′N 19°40′E

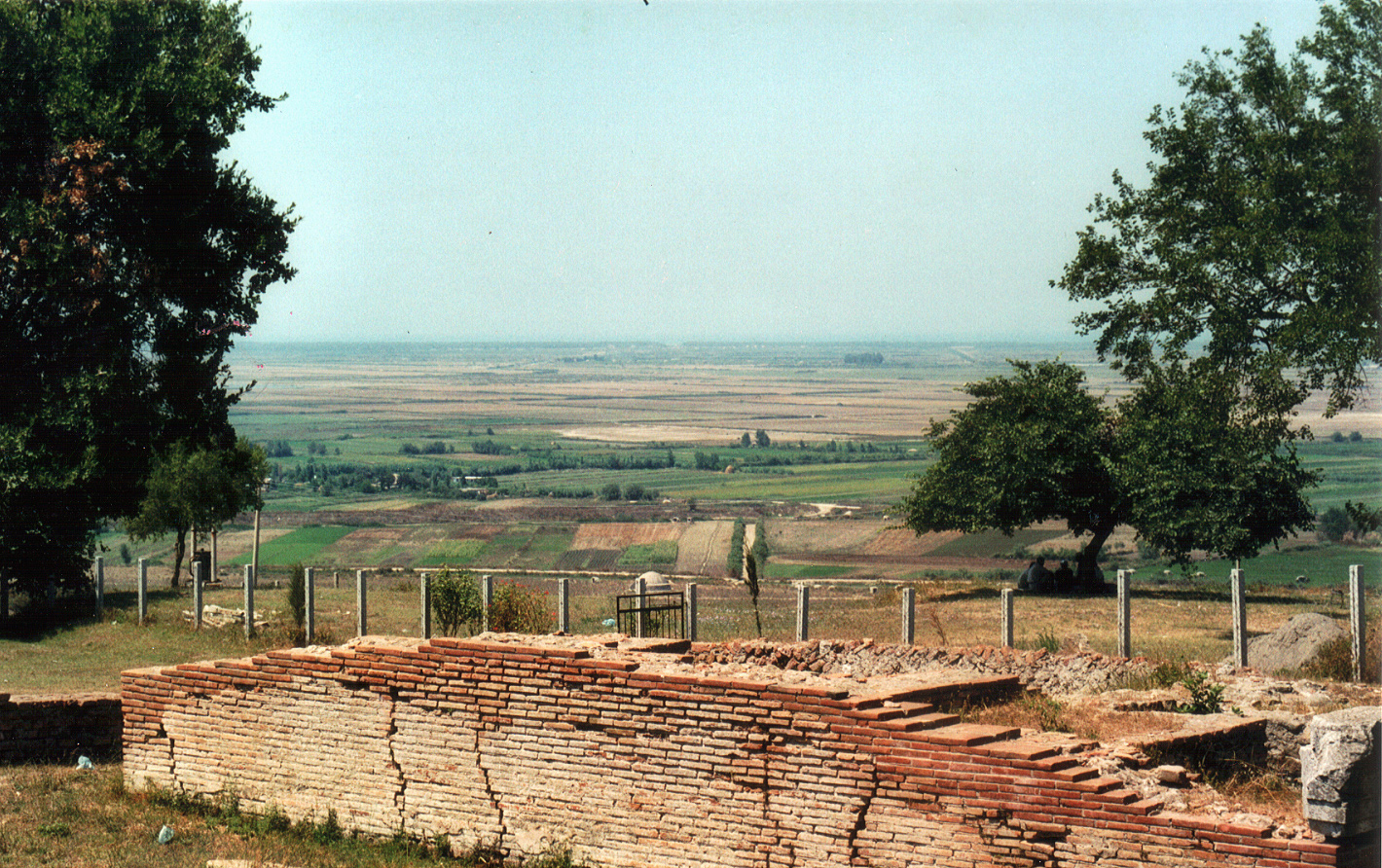
The Myzeqe plain, seen from the ancient city of Apollonia.

The Myzeqe (Albanian: [myzɛˈcɛ]; Albanian definite form: Myzeqeja; Aromanian: Muzachia) is a plain in the Western Lowlands of Albania. The Myzeqe is the largest and widest plain, measured by area, in the Lowlands.

== Location ==
The Myzeqe plain is a large alluvial plain traversed by three main rivers, the Shkumbin, Seman and Vjosë. The Vjosë gives a rough approximation of the southern extent of the Myzeqe, while the Shkumbin is roughly its northern extent. Administratively, the region falls mainly within Lushnjë and Fier District.

Other terms like Myzeqeja e Vogël (Small Myzeqe), Myzeqeja e Beratit (Berat's Myzeqe), or Myzeqeja e Vlorës (Vlora's Myzeqe) are used to point respectively to the Fier part of the region, and to tiny parts that fall into the adjacent districts of Berat and Vlorë. It stretches 65 km north–south and 50 km east–west, with a total area of around 1350 square kilometers. The oldest population to inhabit the Myzeqe plain are the Albanian tribe of the Lalë.

== Etymology ==
The name of the region comes from the Medieval times, it is named after the ruling family of Muzaka (1280 – 1600) which possessed the area. The toponym is first recorded as Musachia in 1417.

== History ==
In antiquity, the Greek colony of Apollonia was founded near the coast. The site of Apollonia lay on the territory of the Taulantii, a cluster of Illyrian tribes that remained closely involved with the settlement for centuries and lived alongside the Greek colonists. The Taulantii controlled much of the plain of Myzeqe in classical antiquity.

In the Middle Ages, and was ruled by various Albanian noble families including the Skuraj and Muzaka families. At various times it was included in the Byzantine Empire and the Bulgarian Empire, often with the local ruling families serving as vassals to the rulers of the realm. Plenty of Slavic language toponyms are present in Myzeqe.

In the late 13th century the area came under the rule of the officially Catholic and French-tied Angevin Kingdom of Albania. At first, relations were bad between the kingdom's rulers and the local nobility, and at times the nobility, such Gjin Muzaka, collaborated with the Byzantines against the kingdom. However, over time the local house of Muzaka came to view the Angevin royal family of Albania as their allies and protectors especially as the threat of Serbian expansion increased, and became more loyal to them. They were given titles as the region became influenced by the Western style of feudalism. At the same time, the Angevins allowed the local rulers to keep their Orthodox faith. In 1318, Andrea I Muzaka became the first ever Orthodox Albanian to be the head general of the kingdom's army, and the Muzakas played a role in King Charles' battles against the Serbs. In other conflicts, the Muzakas sided again with Byzantium, with Andrea II Muzaka being honored for his service to the Byzantine cause in 1335 after defeating a Serbian army in the Pelister mountains near Bitola. The remnants of Byzantine control over the region collapsed during the 1341-1347 Byzantine civil war, creating an opportunity which was taken by the Serbian ruler Stefan Dushan, at the expense of the Kingdom of Albania.

In the middle of the 14th century, the region was conquered by Stefan Dushan of Serbia, but it did not take long for the Serbian Empire's control over the region to fragment as the local families reasserted control. Four decades later, the Battle of Savra (as one of the plains of Myzeqe was known in the Middle Ages) marked the ascendancy of the Ottoman Empire in the region. In the 15th century, the Muzaka family and other local Albanian lords joined Skanderbeg's League of Lezhë to try to contain the growing dominance of the Ottomans, but after a long conflict, Myzeqe as well as wider Albania ended up decisively under Ottoman rule until the early 20th century. Some of the local Albanian rulers as well as some of the population ended up fleeing to foreign countries, but some of the rulers stayed and became integrated into the Ottoman power apparatus.

In the 18th century, Ali Pasha of Tepelene, ruled a large despotate spanning large swaths of Albania, Macedonia and Greece, and gained de facto independence for a time from the Ottoman power center. However, ultimately, Myzeqe as well as the rest of Southern Albania was once again brought back under Ottoman control.

In the late Ottoman era, Myzeqeja had a high rate of malaria, as was generally true of wetter areas in the wider region during that time.

In 1835 the region rose in rebellion against the Ottoman government, the rebels took victory after victory but due to the corrupt leaders the rebellion failed. In 1837 the region rebelled again but it was quickly crushed by the Ottomans.

In the 20th century, the region was included in newly independent Albania. The middle of the century brought massive changes to the region as large numbers of Cham Albanian refugees from Greece were settled in it, and its wetlands were rapidly drained and industrialized under Communism, turning it into the "granary" of Albania.

== Population ==
Myzeqe was historically inhabited by the Lalë, a local Albanian tribe. The medieval Muzaka family was related to this tribe as indicated by the name of its progenitor, Lal Muzhaqi. In the Ottoman period, a number of Albanian settlements in the plain of Myzeqe took place, notably from neighbouring Toskëria and Labëria. Starting from the late 18th century, a small group of Aromanians from the region of Korçë settled in the region as well. In the first half of the 20th century, refugees from Kosovo and the Sandžak also came in the region after it was annexed by Serbia and Montenegro and then included in Yugoslavia.

These waves of settlement mark Myzeqe as the area where all Albanian subgroups: Gheg, Tosk, and Lab populations meet. Most inhabitants are Albanians, but there are Vlachs established mainly in Divjake town, and some of the Fier villages and some Romani people, as well as the linguistically assimilated Bosniaks of Libofshë. All people from the region as called Myzeqarë ("People from Myzeqe") which is widely used on a geographical point of view.

Myzeqe is notable in its religious makeup as one of the few fairly large regions of Albania where a majority of inhabitants remained Orthodox Christian throughout the Ottoman rule. In the nineteenth century, Fier became an economic and commercial centre of the Myzeqe plain which consisted of small settlements and villages populated by Albanians of Orthodox and Muslim faiths and Aromanians. Around the era of Albanian independence, statistics show that around Fier, roughly 65% of the population was Christian, while in Lushnja the numbers of Christians and Muslims were comparable. During the 20th century, many Muslim-background Cham Albanians were settled in Myzeqe due to the Expulsion of Cham Albanians. Additionally, in Libofshë, some of the residents are Bosniaks who settled in the village in the early 1920s and have become linguistically assimilated and have integrated.

== Economy ==
This region is prominent for its agricultural potential, which was not always utilized. Most of today's fields were practically swamps and desolate lands until after World War II. This caused seasonal migration of the population. After World War II, the communist government launched massive campaigns for draining the area. Following the increase in agricultural potential, the region gained significant importance. Since then, Myzeqe has been called the "Albanian granary". Considerable industrialization around Fier became prominent during the communist regime in Myzeqeja although industrial decay began after the collapse of the Albanian communist regime between 1990 and 1992. Presently the Myzeqe plain is an important region for Albania's petroleum industry in addition to agriculture.
