= Maria Balsha, Countess of Muro =

Countess of Acerenza and Muro

Maria Balšić
- Countess of Acerenza and Muro
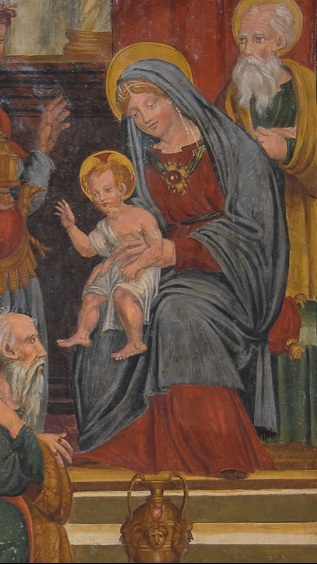
- Alleged portrait of Maria as the Virgin Mary in the Cathedral of Acerenza by Giovanni Todisco
- Predecessor: Maria Anna Rossi
- Born: c. 1461; Albania
- Died: June 16th 1559; Kingdom of Naples
- Buried: Acerenza, Italy
- Noble family: Balšić
- Spouse: Giacomo Alfonso Ferrillo
- Issue: Beatrice Ferrillo, Countess of Acerenza and Muro; Isabella Ferrillo, Lady of Montefredane
- Father: Gojko Balšić, Lord of Misia
- Mother: Comita Arianiti

Maria Balšić (Italian: Maria Balsa; Maria del Balzo; Albanian: Maria Balsha; Serbian: Марија Балшић), (c. 1461, June 16 1559) was a noblewoman from the House of Balšić, ruling family of the Principality of Zeta, whose territory was in present-day southern Montenegro and northern Albania. She was Countess of Acerenza and Muro from her marriage to Giacomo Alfonso Ferrillo.

== Early life ==
Maria Balšić was the daughter of Gojko Balšić, Lord of Misia and his wife, Comita Arianiti. Her father was a nephew of the Lord of Albania, George Kastrioti Skanderbeg, youngest son of his sister Vlajka Kastrioti. Maria's mother, on the other hand, was the daughter of military leader and ruler of the Principality of Arianiti, George Arianiti and his first wife Maria Muzaka, member of the Muzaka family, which ruled over the Principality of Muzaka. Moreover, Comita's older sister and Maria's aunt, Andronika Arianiti was Skanderbeg's wife, further tying their connection to the Lord of Albania. Maria had two brothers who, according to their cousin John Muzaka, died in Hungary.

During the Ottoman conquest of the Balkans, Maria's father became a key figure of the Albanian resistance. Gojko was one of the founders of the League of Lezhë, a military and diplomatic alliance of the Albanian aristocracy, created on 2 March 1444. He continued to fight against Ottoman invasion even after his uncle's death in 1468.

Together with his sons, Gojko joined forces with the Venetians to prevent the Ottomas from further advance. Meanwhile, the seven year old Maria and her mother Comita, fled together with Andronika and other family members to the Kingdom of Naples.

They were welcomed into the court of Queen Joanna of Aragon and in 1483, when she was 22 years old, Maria was married to Giacomo Alfonso Ferrillo, Count of Muro. The couple had two daughters, Beatrice and Isabella.

== Daughter of Vlad the Impaler theory ==
In 2012, Italian historian Raffaele Glinni published two articles in which he claims Maria as the illegitimate daughter of Vlad III of Walachia. According to the historian, Vlad could be buried in the tomb of Maria's father-in-law, Matteo Ferrillo. The primary reason for this theory, comes from the symbol of a dragon found in the connected blazon of the Ferrillo and the Balšić family. Moreover, he identified Misia with a region in Minor Asia, in modern Turkey. In 2014, the same author re-identifies it with the historical region of Dobruja, today shared by Romania and Bulgaria.

In reality, the Misia ruled by Gojko Balšić was a coastal region between the cities of Kruja and Lezha in modern Albania. Furthermore, the historian does not take into account how the symbol of the dragon is linked to Maria's maternal grandfather George Arianiti and uncle Skanderbeg, both members of the Order of the Dragon. No historical source ever mentions any meeting having taken place between Comita Arianiti and Vlad the Impaler, nor any illegitimacy rumors concerning Maria Balsha's paternity, prior to Glinni's publication.

== Ancestry ==
Ancestors of Maria Balsha, Countess of Muro

16. Đurađ I Balšić
8. George Balšić
17. Unknown misstress
4. Stefan Strez Balšić
2. Gojko Balšić
20. Pal Kastrioti
10. Gjon Kastrioti
5. Vlaika Kastrioti
11. Voisava Tripalda
1. Maria Balšić
12. Komnen Arianiti
6. Gjergj Arianiti
26. Nikollë Zaharia
13. Nikollë Zaharia's daughter
3. Comita Arianiti
28. Gjin I Muzaka
14. Andrea III Muzaka
29. Zanfina Arianiti
7. Maria Muzaka
30. Gjon Zenebishi
15. Chiranna Zenebishi
31. Irene Bua Spata

== See also ==
- Arianiti family
- Balsha family
