= Comita Arianiti =

15th century Albanian Princess

Comita Arianiti Komita Arianiti
- Lady of Misia
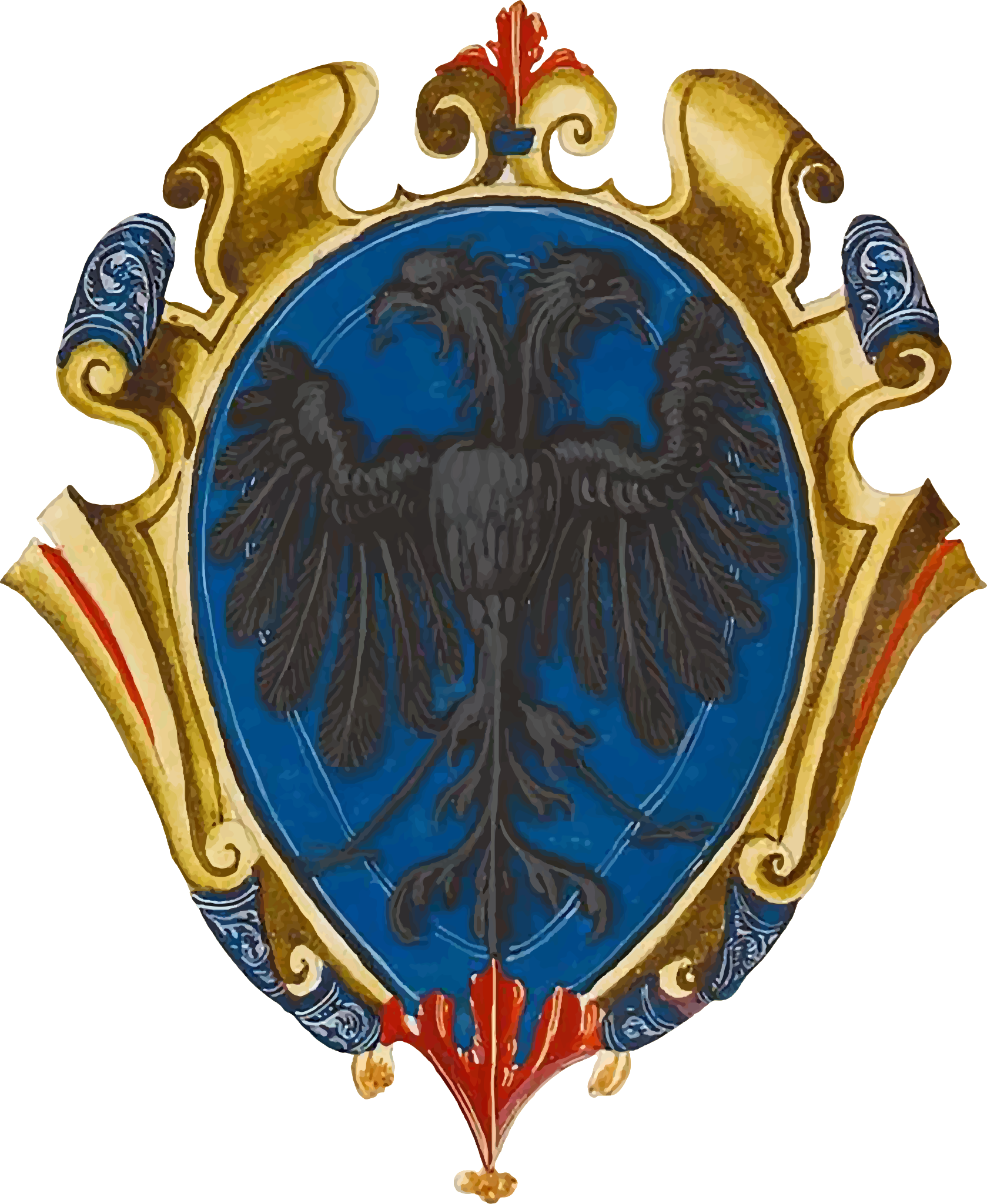
- Coat of arms of the Arianiti family

Lady of Misia
- Tenure: 14?? – 14??
- Born: c. 1440s
- Died: After 1514
- Spouse: Gojko Balsha
- Issue: Unknown Son; Unknown Son; Maria Balsha, Countess of Muro
- Dynasty: Arianiti
- Father: Gjergj Arianiti
- Mother: Maria Muzaka
- Religion: Eastern Orthodoxy

Comita Arianiti (Albanian: Komita Arianiti) also known as Comita Arianiti Comneno, Komina, Komnin or Komnena was a 15th century Albanian princess from the House of Arianiti. After her marriage with Gojko Balsha she became the Lady of Misia.

== Life and marriage ==
Comita Arianiti, born around the mid-15th century, was the seventh daughter of Gjergj Arianiti, a prominent Albanian nobleman and military commander, and his first wife Maria Muzaka, a member of the Muzaka family. She was part of the noble House of Arianiti, one of the leading aristocratic families in Albania during the resistance against Ottoman expansion. Not much is known about her early life.

She was the sister-in-law of Skanderbeg through her sister Donika Arianiti's marriage to the famed Albanian leader.

Comita married Gojko Balsha who was the Lord of Misia. Misia was a territory between Krujë and Lezhë. Gojko who was the nephew of Skanderbeg, joined the League of Lezhë in 1444 alongside his brothers Gjergj Strez Balsha and Gjon Balsha, forming part of the Albanian resistance against Ottoman expansion.

== Later life and death ==
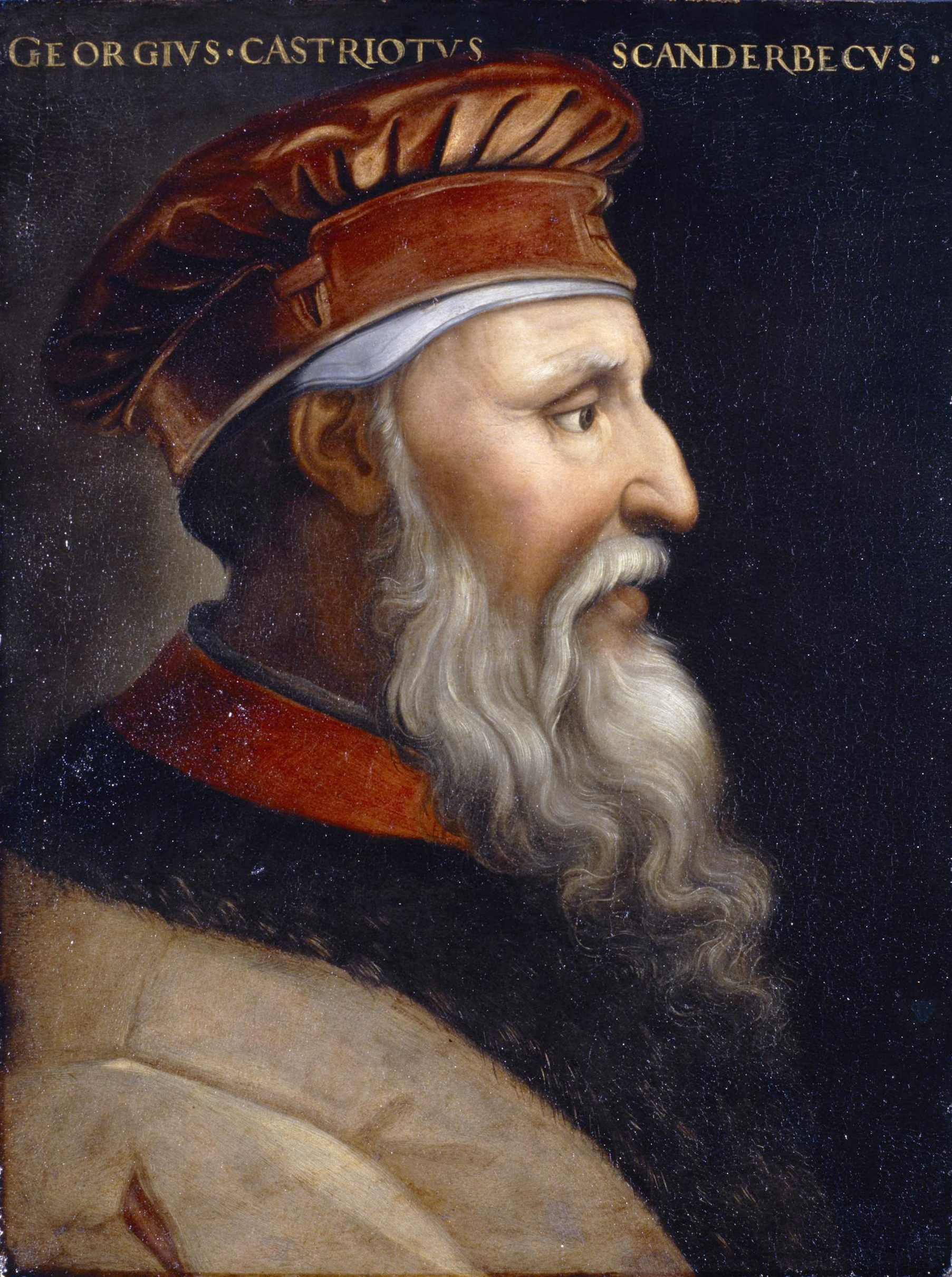
Skanderbeg

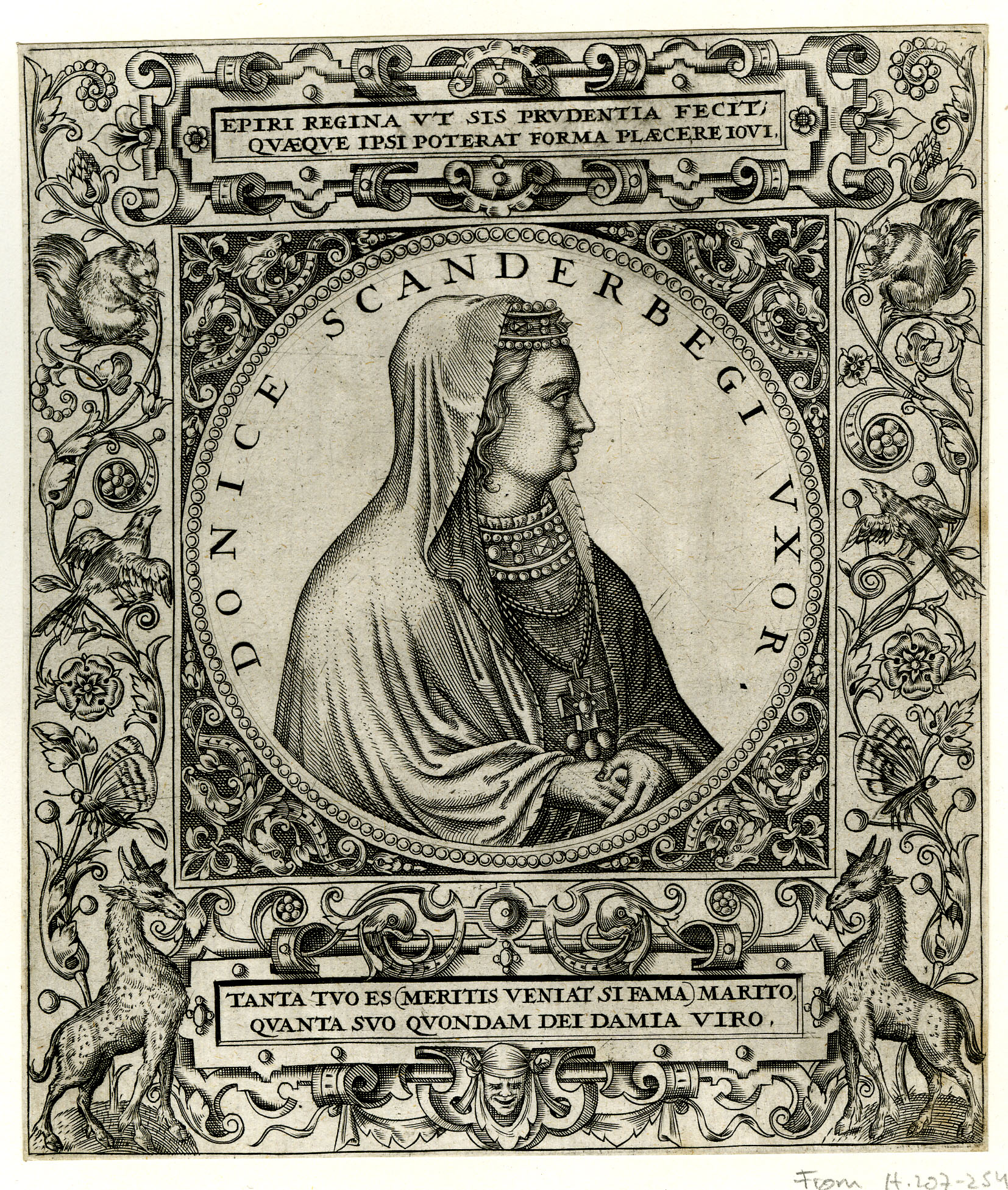
Donika Arianiti

Following the death of Skanderbeg in 1468, Comita Arianiti and her family fled to Italy amid the political upheaval in the Balkans. She was accompanied by her husband, Gojko Balsha, her daughter Maria Balsha who was 7, her sister Donika Arianiti who was the widow of Skanderbeg and her nephew Gjon Kastrioti II, along with many other women and children who escaped with them. Upon arrival in the Kingdom of Naples, they were graciously received.

In 1483, Comita's daughter Maria married Giacomo Alfonso Ferrillo, the Count of Muro. Giacomo Alfonso was the son of Mazzeo Ferrillo, who served as the treasurer to Alfonso II, Duke of Calabria, and was a prominent figure at the Aragonese court in Naples. Known for his noble character and education, Giacomo Alfonso held the title of Count of Muro by at least 1501. Between 1511 and 1516, he governed the provinces of Terra d'Otranto and Bari.

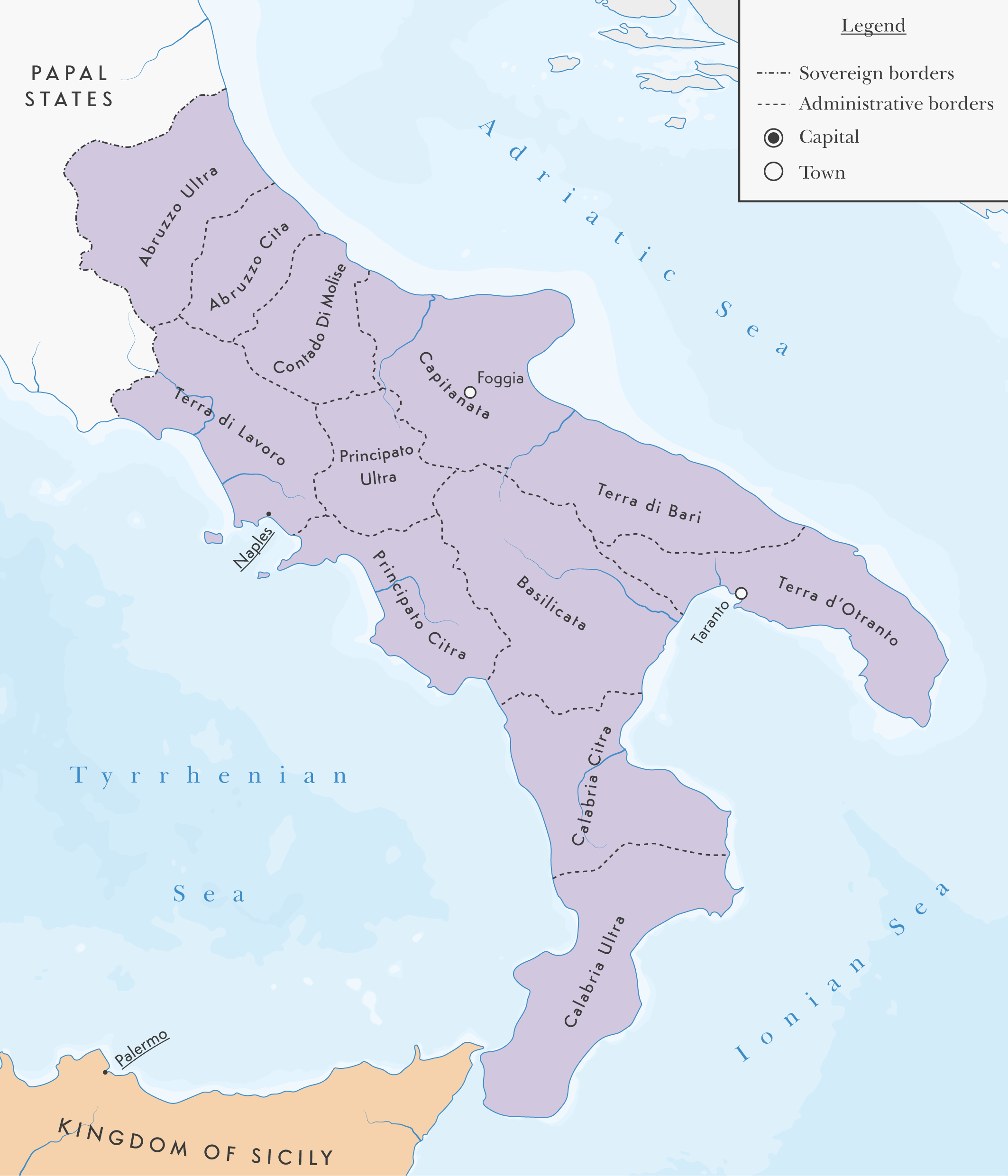
Map of the Kingdom of Naples. Terra d'Otranto & Terra d'Bari, governed by Giacomo Alfonso Ferrillo located in the easternmost part of the kingdom, directly facing Albania

Map of the Sanjak of Avlona

In 1514, the Ottoman Sanjak of Valona (Vlorë) sent a diplomatic letter dated March 22 to Giacomo Alfonso Ferrillo, Count of Muro and governor of Terra d'Otranto and Bari in the Kingdom of Naples. The letter reveals a clear effort to maintain peaceful and cooperative relations between the Ottoman Empire and Naples, despite ongoing regional conflicts. It also sends respectful greetings to Ferrillo's wife, Maria Balsha, and to Comita herself, showing their continued family and diplomatic connections across the Adriatic. This document shows that Comita and her family remained influential in Southern Italy's political and economic affairs decades after their migration, as well as indicating that Comita was still alive in 1514.

The Sanjak-bey of Valona who sent the 1514 letter was likely of Albanian origin. Although his exact identity is uncertain, evidence points to him belonging to one of the local noble families such as the Dukagjini family or Kastrioti family, many of whose members converted to Islam to maintain influence under Ottoman rule. For example, a sanjak-bey named Mustafa Bey, was identified as a member of the Dukagjini family, and was recorded in the early 1500s as governing Valona and the surrounding region. As well as a cousin of Maria Balsha named Skanderbeg, from the same noble lineage, also served as sanjak-bey during this period. Ottoman sources and reports indicate that the empire preferred appointing sanjak-beys of Albanian origin in Albania to ensure loyalty and obedience, as foreign governors were often resisted by the local population. This helps explain the amicable tone of the letter and the sanjak-bey's familiarity with Maria Balsha and her family, reflecting the ongoing familial ties bridging Albania and southern Italy.

== Family ==
Comita Arianiti married Gojko Balsha. The couple had three children:

- Unknown Son, Died in Hungary
- Unknown Son, Died in Hungary
- Maria Balsha, Countess of Muro, Countess of Acerenza and Muro. Married Giacomo Alfonso Ferrillo, Count of Acerenza and Muro. Had two daughters Lady Beatrice Ferrillo and Lady Isabel Ferrillo.

== Family tree ==
Ancestors of Comita Arianiti

8. Unknown
4. Komnen Arianiti
9. Unknown
2. Gjergj Arianiti
10. Nikollë Zaharia
5. Lady of Zaharia
11. Unknown
1. Comita Arianiti
12. Gjin I Muzaka
6. Andrea III Muzaka
13. Zanfina Arianiti Comninata
3. Maria Muzaka
14. Gjon Zenebishi
7. Chiranna Zenevisi, Lady of Grabossa
15. Unknown

== See also ==
- Arianiti family

== Bibliography ==
- Elsie, Robert (2003). Early Albania: A Reader of Historical Texts, 11th-17th Centuries. Harrassowitz. ISBN 978-3-4470-4783-8.
- Fine, John V. A. (1994). The Late Medieval Balkans: A Critical Survey from the Late Twelfth Century to the Ottoman Conquest. University of Michigan Press. ISBN 978-0-4720-8260-5.
- Hopf, Karl (1873). Chroniques greco-romanes inedites ou peu connues [Unpublished or little-known Greco-Roman chronicles] (in French). Weidmann.
- Noli, Fan Stylian Noli (1945). George Castrioti Scanderbeg, 1405-1468. International Universities Press.
- Rescio, Alberto (2018). Una Amicabile Practica Tra l'Albania e La Puglia Nel 1514 Mediterranea ricerche storiche, n. 43 [A Friendly Practice Between Albania And Puglia In 1514] (in Italian).
- Sainty, Guy Stair (2018). The Constantinian Order of Saint George and the Angeli, Farnese and Bourbon families which governed it. Boletín Oficial del Estado. ISBN 978-8-4340-2506-6.
- Schmitt, Oliver Jens (2001). Das venezianische Albanien (1392-1479) [Venetian Albania (1392-1479)] (in German). Oldenbourg. ISBN 978-3-4865-6569-0.
- Slijepčević, Đoko M. (1983). Srpsko-arbanaški odnosi kroz vekove sa posebnim osvrtom na novije vreme [Serbian-Albanian relations through the centuries with special reference to recent times] (in Serbian). D. Slijepčević.
