= Angelina of Serbia =

Despotess of Serbia and Orthodox saint (c. 1440–1520)

Saint Angelina of Serbia
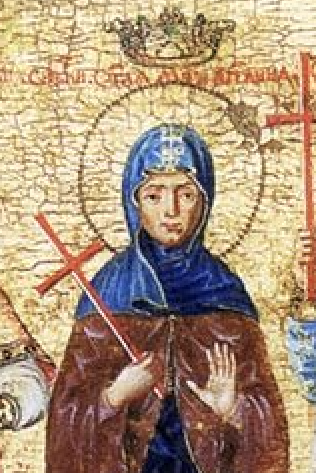
- A detail of Saint Angelina by Andrija Raičević, created around 1645

Right-Believing, Venerable, Mother
- Venerated in: Eastern Orthodox Church
- Major shrine: Krušedol Monastery, Serbia
- Feast: 14 July [O.S. 1 July] 12 August [O.S. 30 July] 23 December [O.S. 10 December] (with St. Stephen and St. John Branković)

Despotess of Serbia
- Tenure: 1460 - October 9, 1476
- Predecessor: Helena Palaiologina, Despotess of Serbia
- Born: Angjelina Arianiti c. 1440; Berat, Ottoman Empire
- Died: 1520; Krušedol Monastery, Ottoman Empire
- Burial: Krušedol Monastery
- Spouse: Stefan Branković
- Issue: Đorđe Branković; Jovan Branković; Irene Branković; Maria of Serbia, Marchioness of Montferrat
- House: Arianiti
- Father: Gjergj Arianiti
- Mother: Maria Muzaka
- Religion: Serbian Orthodox Christian

Angelina Branković (Serbian Cyrillic: Ангелина Бранковић; Church Slavonic: Ангели́на Бра́нкович; Albanian: Angjelina Arianiti, Angjelina e Krujës; c. 1440–1520), née Arianiti, was an Albanian princess of who served as Despotess Consort of Serbia through her marriage to Despot Stefan Branković (r. 1458–1459). She was a daughter of Prince Gjergj Arianiti, an important military leader against Ottoman invasion, and Princess Maria Muzaka, his first wife. For her pious life she was proclaimed a saint and venerated as such by the Serbian Orthodox Church as Venerable Mother Angelina (Serbian: Преподобна мати Ангелина, romanized: Prepodobna mati Angelina).

== Life ==
Angelina, born as a member of the Albanian Arianiti family, was the sixth daughter of Gjergj Arianiti (1383–1462), and Maria Muzaka (1410s–1440s), eldest daughter of Despot Andrea III Muzaka and his wife Anna Zenevisi, Lady of Grabossa. In 1460, she married exiled Serbian ruler Stefan Branković (r. 1458–1459), son of the former Despot Đurađ Branković (r. 1427–1456). They met when Stefan came to Northern Albania, to visit Skanderbeg, who was married to Angelina's elder sister Andronika Arianiti. They lived in Shkodër, at the time under Albania Veneta. In 1461, she gave birth to her eldest son Đorđe (anglicised: George), who was named after Skanderbeg and her father Gjergj Arianiti.

Eventually, the couple left Albania for Northern Italy, and acquired castle Belgrado in the region of Friuli. Stefan died in 1476, at family estate in Belgrado. At first, Angelina and their children remained in northern Italy. In 1479, emperor Friedrich III granted them castle Weitensfeld, and Angelina with her children moved to Carinthia.

In 1485, their cousin, titular Serbian Despot Vuk Branković died, and Hungarian king Matthias Corvinus invited Angelina's sons to take over their dynastic inheritance. Angelina and her family went to the Kingdom of Hungary, where her elder son, George, became new titular despot of the Serbian Despotate (1486). The territory of the Despotate had been under the Ottoman Empire since its collapse in 1459. Later Angelina retired in the Krušedol Monastery, in the Fruška Gora mountain of Syrmia, where she died in the beginning of the 16th century.

=== Marriage and children ===
Angelina and Stefan were married from 1461 until his death in 1476. They had children:

- Đorđe (d. 18 January 1516). Titular despot of Serbia (1486), under the auspices of the Kingdom of Hungary. Married to Isabella del Balzo, daughter of Agilberto, Duke of Nardò. Later retired as a monk, under the monastic name "Maxim". Served as Metropolitan of Ungro-Wallachia until 1508, later becoming Metropolitan of Belgrade.
- Jovan (d. 10 December 1502). Titular despot of Serbia, under the auspices of the Kingdom of Hungary. Married to Jelena Jakšić, member of powerful House of Jakšić. They had several daughters, but no male issue.
- Irene Branković: mentioned as the third born in the Massarelli Manuscript. Believed to have died in childhood.
- Maria, Marchioness of Montferrat (d. 27 August 1495), named after her maternal grandmother Maria Muzaka. She married Boniface III, Marquess of Montferrat (1424–1494, r. 1483–1494), with whom she had two sons.

== Sainthood ==
Members of the Branković dynasty were known among contemporaries for their devotion to Eastern Orthodox Christianity, and Angelina belonged to the same tradition. She is venerated as a saint by the Eastern Orthodox Church, being commemorated with feast days on 1 July and 30 July, also being commemorated on 10 December together with her husband, St. Stephen, and her son, St. John. She wrote a hagiography known as the Hagiography of Mother Angelina (Serbian: Житије мајке Ангелине, romanized: Žitije majke Angeline).

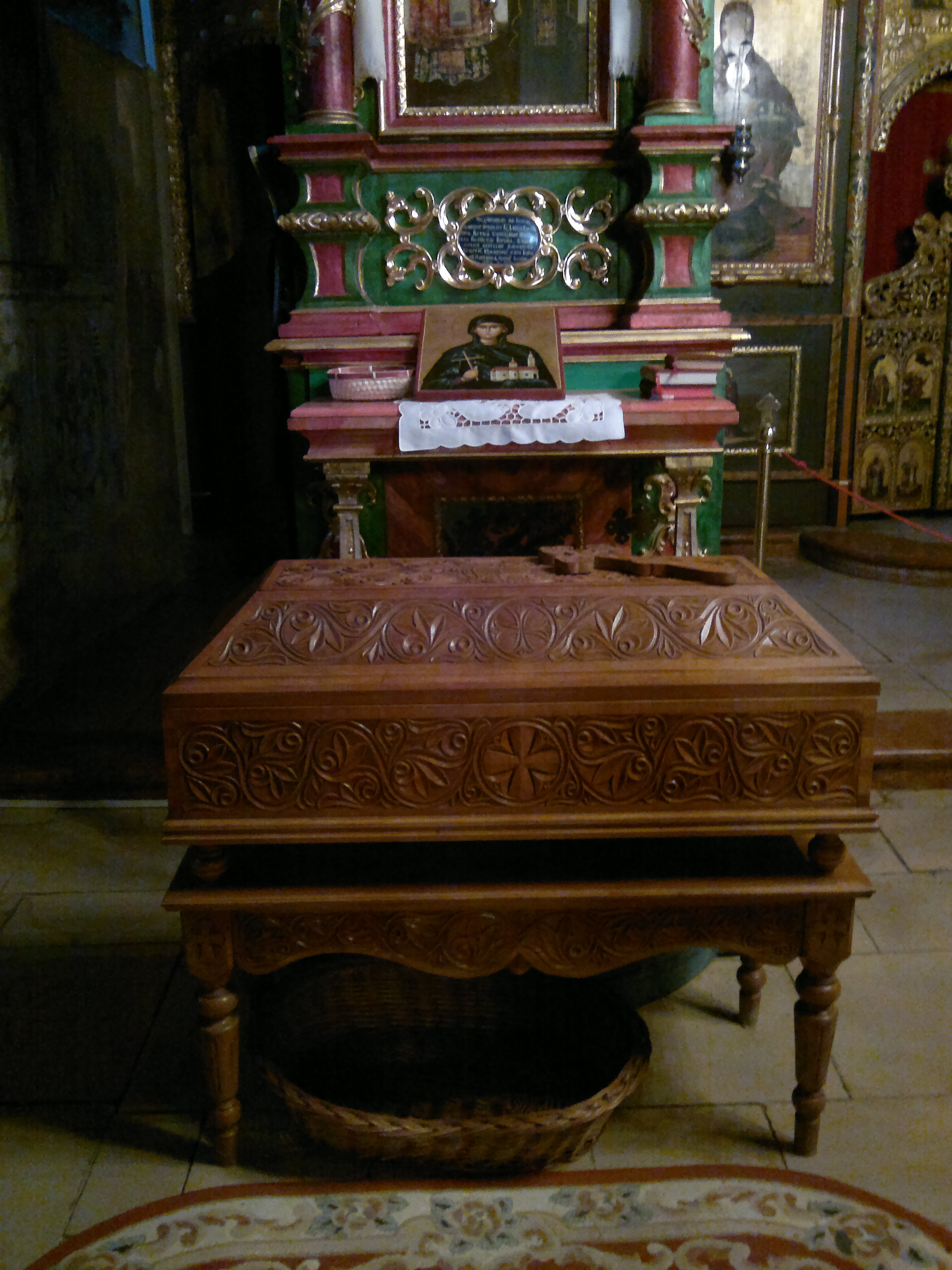
Reliquary of Saint Angelina's relics

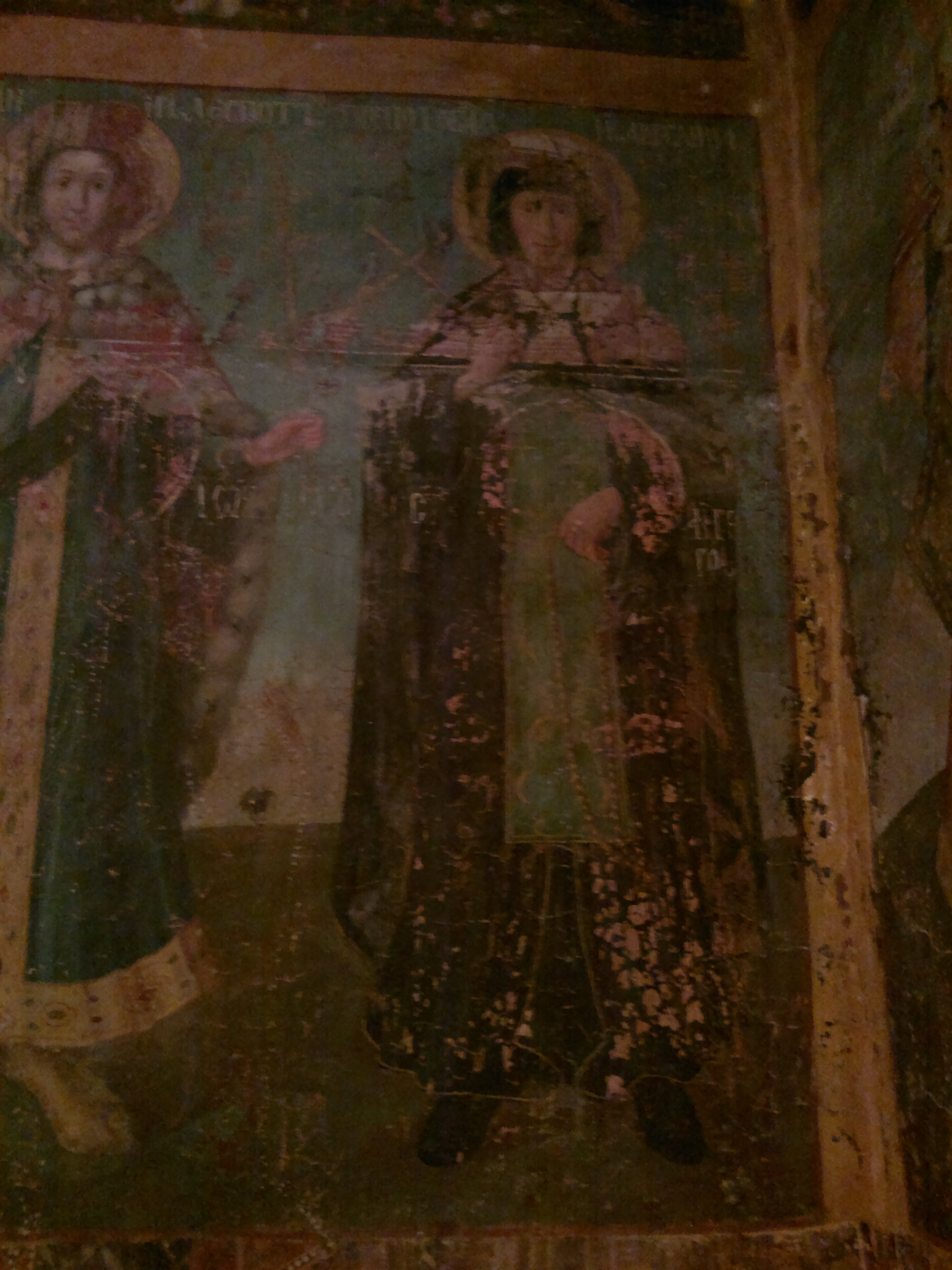
Fresco of Saint Angelina

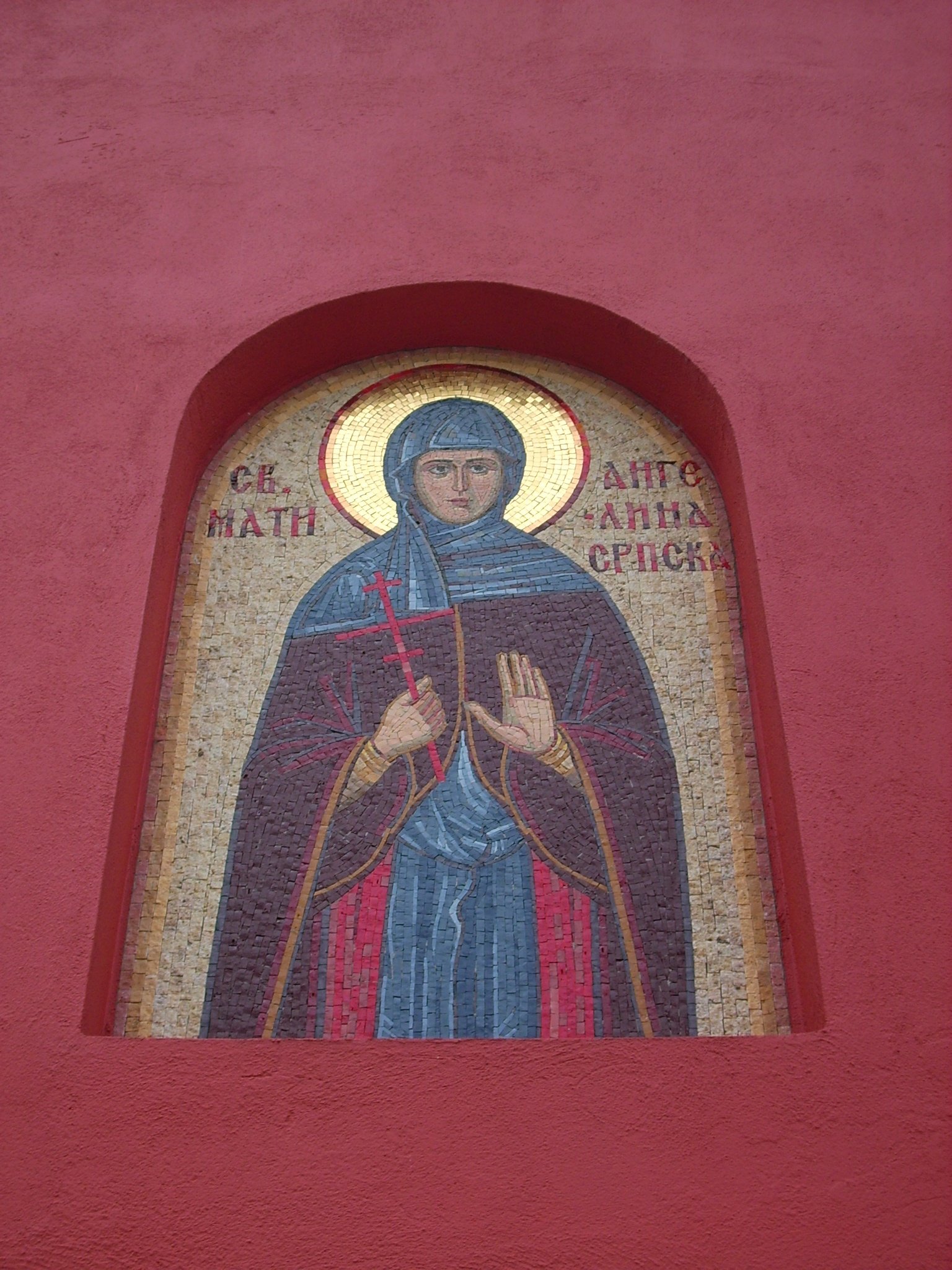
Outer wall of Krušedol Monastery, containing a mosaic of Saint Angelina in monastic vestments and holding a red Byzantine cross

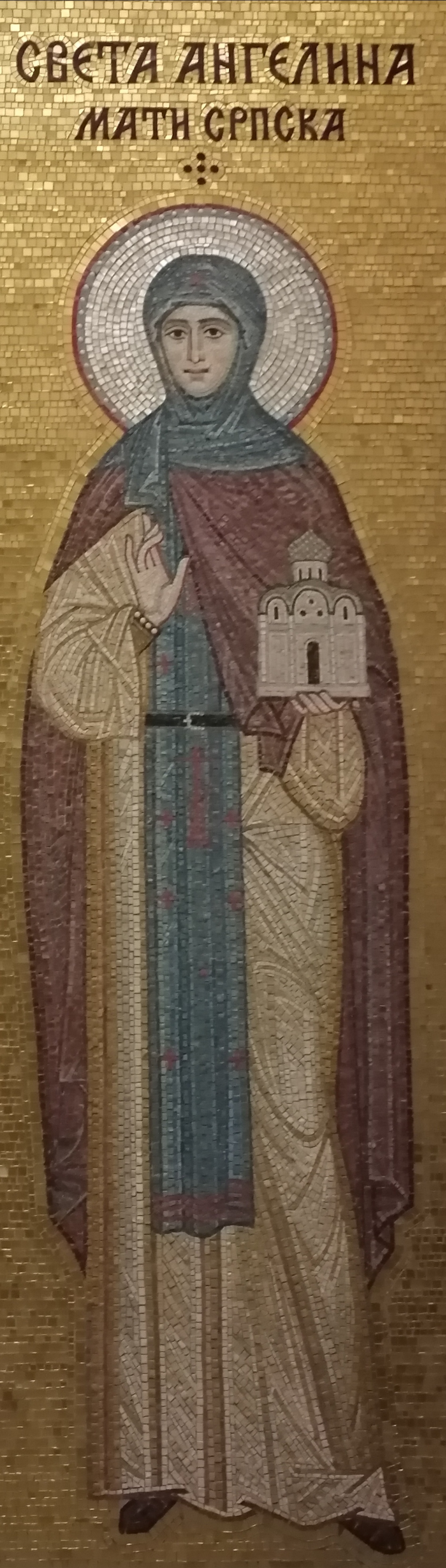
Mosaic in the Temple of Saint Sava, Belgrade, depicting her in monastic garments and holding a church (an attribute typically given to ktetors)

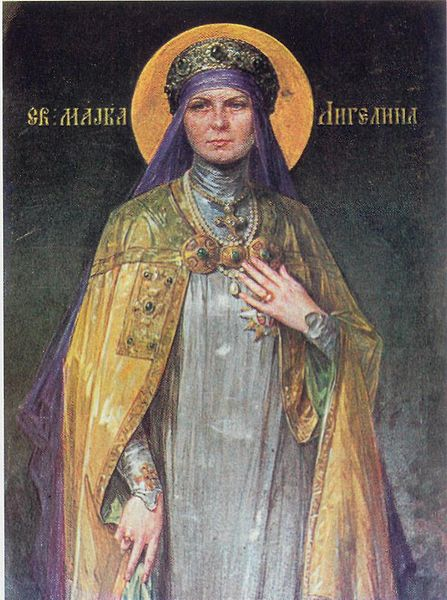
Eastern Orthodox icon of Saint Angelina

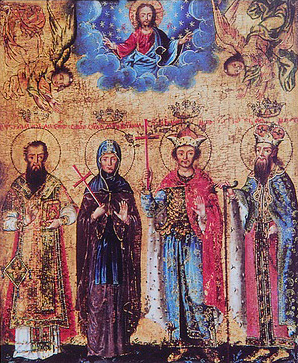
17th-century Eastern Orthodox icon depicting Saint Angelina and her family

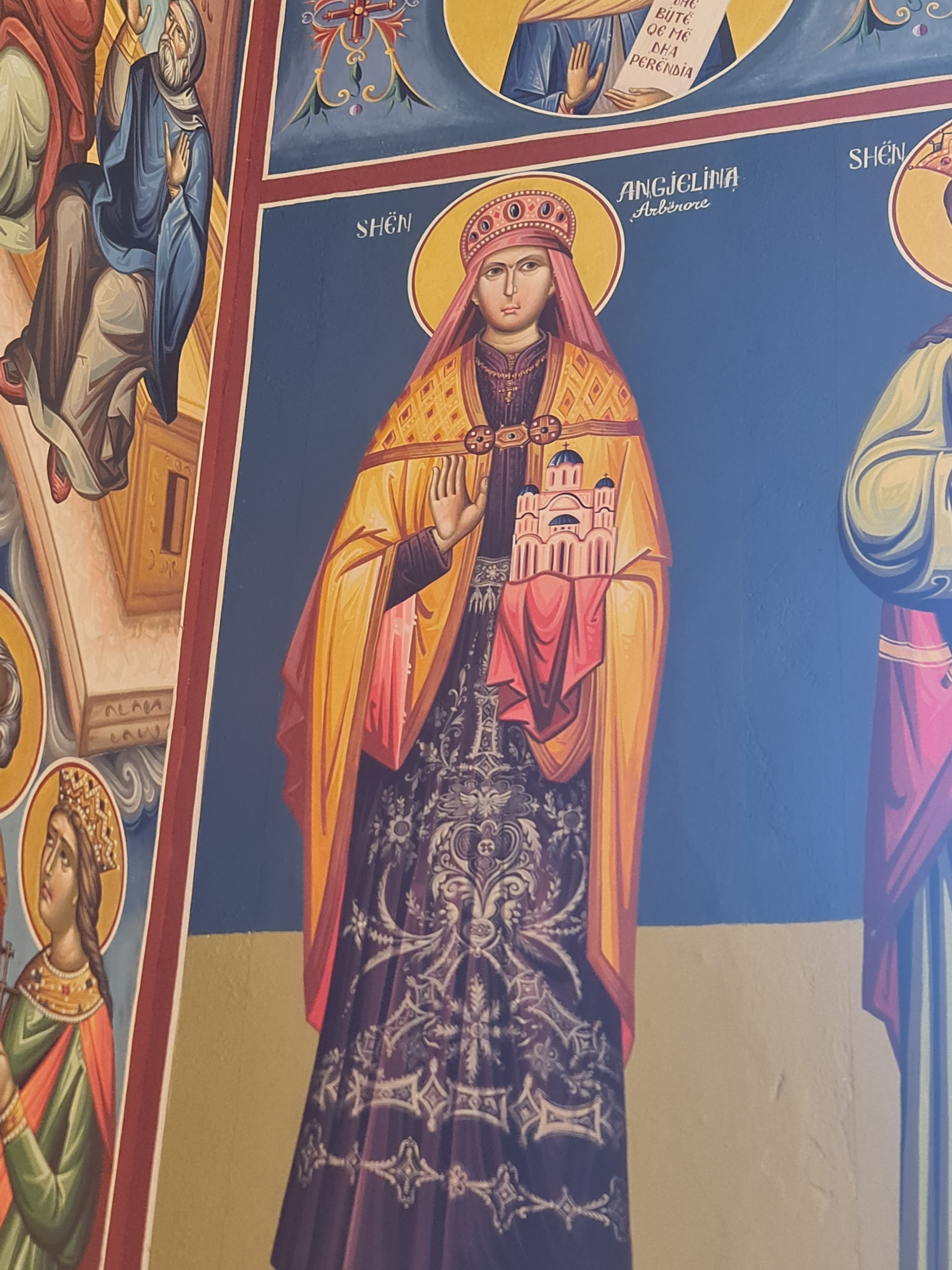
Eastern Orthodox icon of Angjelina in Berat, Albania

== Ancestry ==
Ancestors of Angelina of Serbia

4. Komnen Arianiti
2. Gjergj Arianiti
10. Nikollë Zaharia
5. Lady of Zaharia
1. Angjelina Arianiti
12. Gjin I Muzaka
6. Andrea III Muzaka
13. Zanfina Arianiti
3. Maria Muzaka
14. Gjon Zenebishi
7. Kirana Zenebishi
30. Gjin Bua Shpata
15. Unknown Daughter

== Annotations ==
1. Her name in Serbian was Angelina Branković (Serbian: Ангелина Бранковић/Angelina Branković), née Arianit Komneni. She is also known as simply Despotess Angelina (Serbian: деспотица Ангелина/Despotica Angelina). The Serbian Orthodox Church and Serbian epic poetry calls her Venerable Mother Angelina (Serbian: Преподобна мати Ангелина/Predobra mati Angelina), or simply Mother Angelina or Saint Angelina (Serbian: Света Ангелина/Sveta Angelina, Albanian: Shën Angjelina).

== See also ==
- List of Serbian saints
- List of Eastern Orthodox saints
- Arianiti family
- Branković dynasty

== Sources ==
- Andrić, Stanko (2016). "Saint John Capistran and Despot George Branković: An Impossible Compromise". Byzantinoslavica. 74 (1–2): 202–227.
- Bataković, Dušan T., ed. (2005). Histoire du peuple serbe [History of the Serbian People] (in French). Lausanne: L’Age d’Homme. ISBN 9782825119587.
- Ćirković, Sima (2004). The Serbs. Malden: Blackwell Publishing. ISBN 9781405142915.
- Gapska, Dominika (2013). "Angelina Branković – święta władczyni w hymnografii: Zarys problemu". Poznańskie Studia Slawistyczne (in Polish). 5 (5): 103–115. doi:10.14746/pss.2013.5.7. hdl:10593/9935.
- Ivić, Pavle, ed. (1995). The History of Serbian Culture. Edgware: Porthill Publishers. ISBN 9781870732314.
- Jireček, Constantin (1918). Geschichte der Serben. Vol. 2. Gotha: Perthes.
- Paizi-Apostolopoulou, Machi (2012). "Appealing to the Authority of a Learned Patriarch: New Evidence on Gennadios Scholarios' Responses to the Questions of George Branković". The Historical Review. 9: 95–116.
- Samardžić, Radovan; Duškov, Milan, eds. (1993). Serbs in European Civilization. Belgrade: Nova, Serbian Academy of Sciences and Arts, Institute for Balkan Studies. ISBN 9788675830153.
- Spremić, Momčilo (2004). "La famille serbe des Branković - considérations généalogiques et héraldiques" (PDF). Зборник радова Византолошког института (in French). 41: 441–452.
