= Gjergj Arianiti =

15th-century Albanian military leader

- Prince of Arianiti
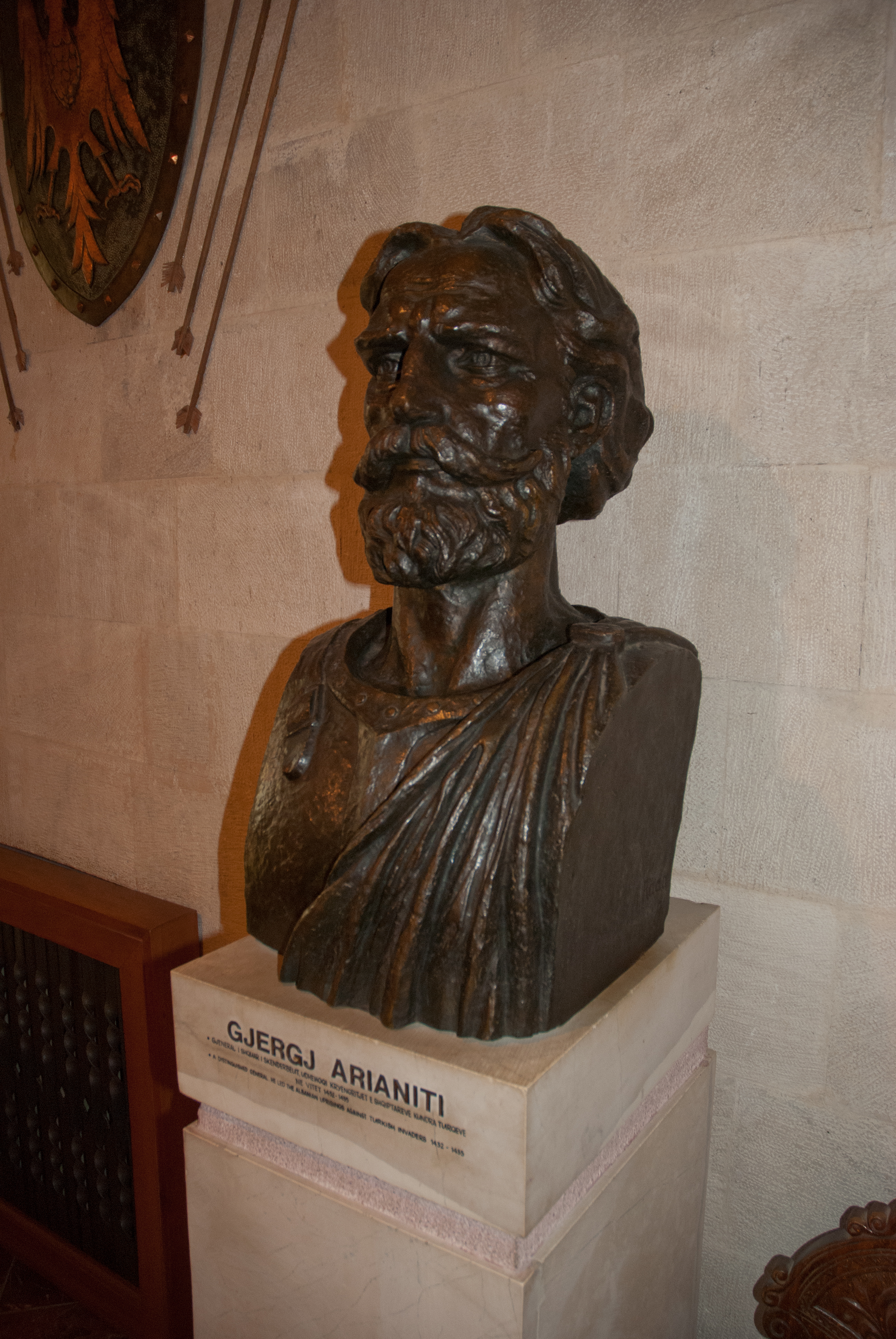
- Modern bust of Gjergj Arianit located in Krujë
- Born: Unknown
- Died: 1462
- Spouses: Maria Muzaka; Pietrina Francone
- Issue: Andronika, Lady of Albania; Voisava, Princess of Zeta; Chiranna, Princess of Dukagjini; Helena, Princess of Dukagjini; Despina, Princess of Dukagjini; Saint Angjelina, Despotess of Serbia; Comita, Lady of Misia; Catherine, Lady of Drivasto; Maria Despina; Theodora Arianiti; Maria, Lady of Cerveteri and Viano; Thomas Arianiti; Constantine Arianiti, Prince of Macedonia; Arianit Arianiti; See family-section
Names
- George Arianiti Thopia Comnenus
- House: Arianiti
- Father: Komnen Arianiti
- Mother: Daughter of Nicholas Zaharia
- Religion: Eastern Orthodoxy
- Occupation: 1423–27: Hostage at the Ottoman court 1431–35: Leader of the Albanian revolt against the Ottoman Empire; 1444–62: Member of the League of Lezhë

Gjergj Arianiti (13??–1462) was an Albanian feudal lord who led several successful campaigns against the Ottoman Empire. He was the father of Donika, Skanderbeg's wife, as well as the uncle of Moisi Golemi. Gjergj Arianiti was Skanderbeg's ally within the League of Lezhë before abandoning the alliance after the capture of Berat by the Ottomans in 1450. Later, he returned. Robert Elsie emphasizes that Arianiti was often Skanderbeg's rival. He allied with the Kingdom of Naples in 1446, left his alliance with Skanderbeg by 1449 and allied with Venice in 1456. However, his daughter married Skanderbeg and he remained officially part of the League of Lezhë, continuing to fight Ottomans successfully up to his death in 1462.

== Name ==
The name Arianiti is most commonly known in the Albanian form, Gjergj Arianiti. In English, it is usually rendered as George Arianiti.

In correspondence with Slavic chancelleries, his name appears in the Slavic form as "Golem Arianit Komnenovic" (Golemi Arenit Cominovich), and a 1452 document referring to him as "Golemi Arenit Comninovich de Albania". Another form of his surname, Haryanites, was used in a French document of the Charles VII era.

== Origin and early life ==
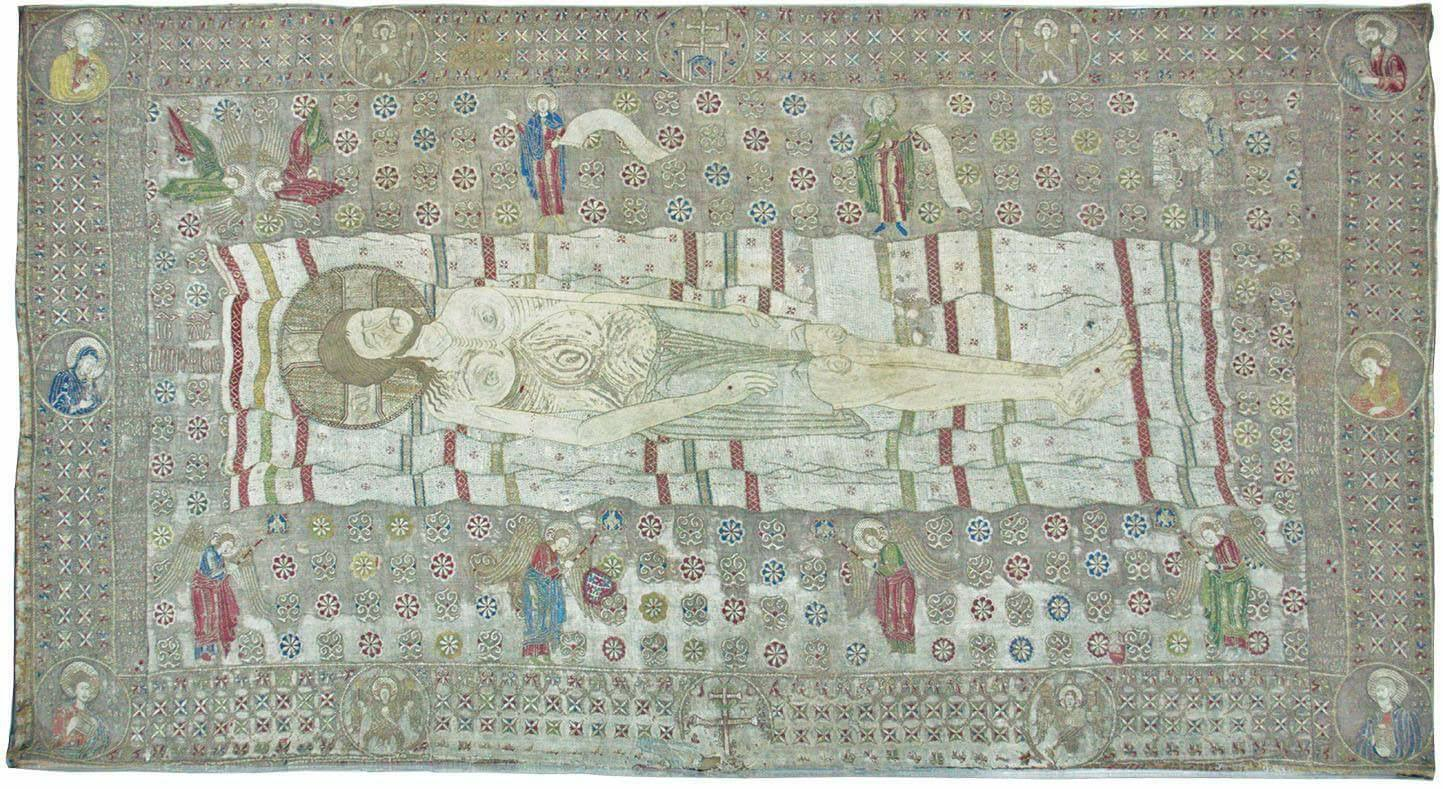
Epitaph of Gllavenica was commissioned by the ruler Gjergj Arianiti in 1373.

Gjergj Arianiti's father was Komnen Arianiti, whose domains were in the vicinity of Durrës (in partibus Durrachii). According to Franz Babinger and Lindsay L. Brook, Arianiti's mother was certainly a daughter of Nicolò Sevati; while according to Dhimitër Shuteriqi she was the daughter of Nikollë Zaharia. Gjergj was the oldest of three sons, his two brothers being Muzakë and Vladan.

He married Maria Muzaka, acquiring a territory from Mallakastër to south of Vlorë. His territories eventually reached northwards to Debar and later were expanded to Bitola. The center of his lands was located between Librazhd and Elbasan. After 1423 he fell under Ottoman political influence and probably resided at the sultan's palace as hostage to secure loyalty of his tribesmen. In 1427 he returned to Albania to govern his lands.

== Campaigns against the Ottoman Empire ==
=== Revolt of 1432–36 ===
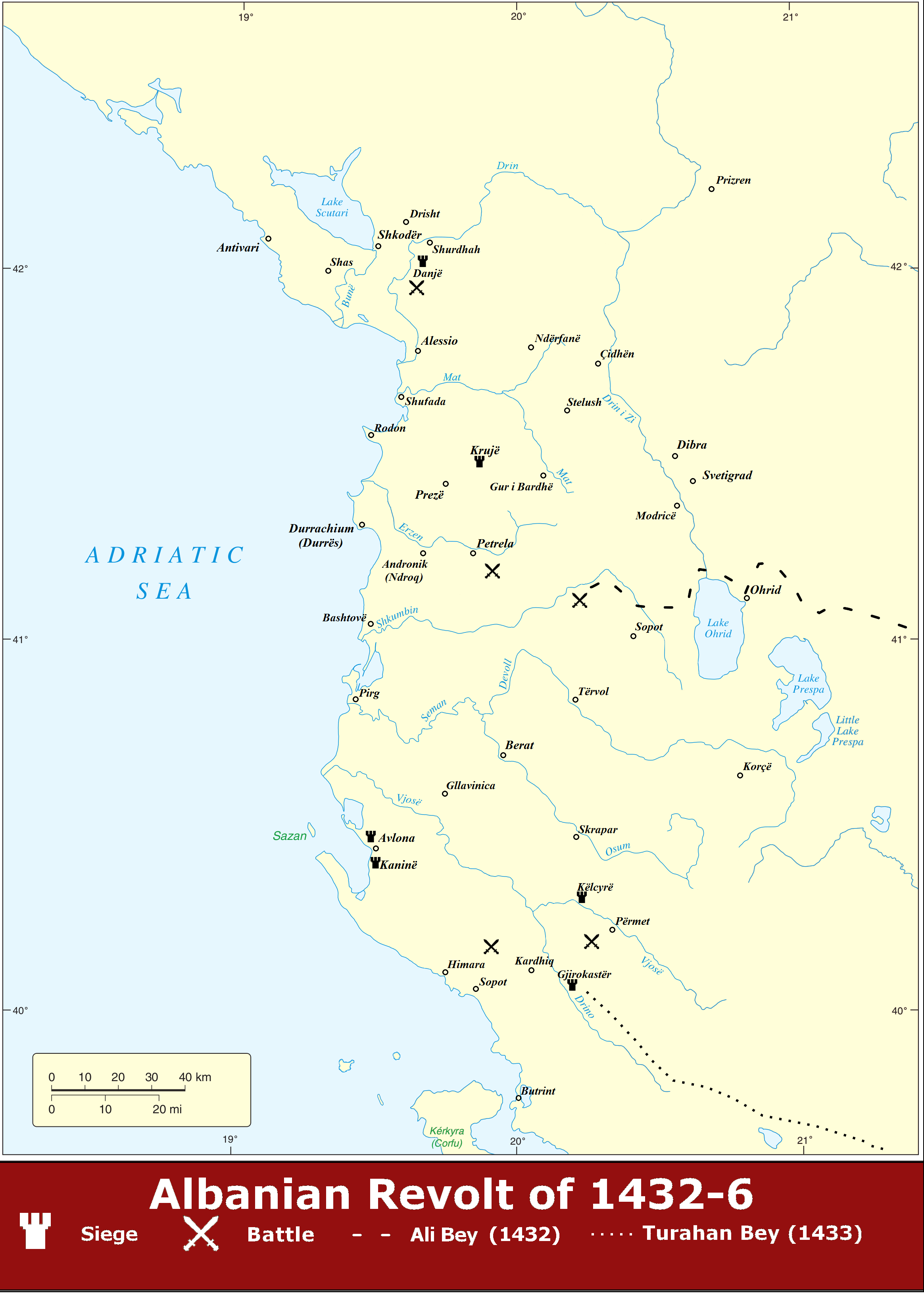
A map of the military activities during the Albanian Revolt of 1432–6

The Ottoman conquest of certain parts of southern Albania brought Ottoman legal, political, and economic systems into the country, influencing all nobles and threatening to destroy the feudal system and autonomy of the nobles. These reforms took away much of Gjergj's power, but he remained a ruler of his lands, even though as a vassal of the Sultan. These drastic changes encouraged revolts against the Ottomans, of which Gjergj Arianiti was one of the main leaders.

In the spring of 1432, after the first phase of the reforms ended, an Albanian revolt erupted which spread to much of Albania. The first revolts began in central Albania when Andrea Thopia revolted against Ottoman rule and defeated a small Ottoman unit in the mountains of central Albania. His victory inspired other chieftains to revolt, especially Arianiti. Gjergj was at first apprehensive, but saw an opportunity to save the dominions left to him by his father. Upon hearing of the rebellions, many Albanian political enemies of Gjergj, who had become sipahi returned from Edirne to Albania. Upon reaching Albania, Gjergj immediately banished them. He was to lead the armed rebellion, which was started by the peasants. Durrës, the Tirana region, and Nicholas Dukagjini in the north joined the revolt. Although Skanderbeg was summoned home by his relatives when Gjergj Arianiti and other chiefs from the region between Vlorë and Shkodër had organized the rebellion, Skanderbeg did nothing, remaining loyal to the Sultan. The Porte responded by sending an army of fresh troops in Albania under experienced commanders. Dagno in northern Albania fell, while the Thopias were returned to their former state. After a strong counterattack by Arianiti, the Ottomans were soon defeated. This victory strengthened the revolt in southern Albania, especially in Kurvelesh. Murad II headed for Albania and chose to camp at Serez in Macedonia, from where he sent out a force of 10,000 into Albania under Ali Beg. The army of Ali Beg, in the winter of 1432–33, went through the tight valleys of the Shkumbin; near Buzurshekut (Bërzeshtës), the Albanians ambushed the Ottoman army. Arianiti observed and maneuvered against the Ottomans while also encouraging his men, eventually leading to an Ottoman rout. This victory further strengthened the Albanian cause and gave hope to the Europeans who feared a major Ottoman invasion. The Byzantine chronicler, Chalcondyles, wrote: "In this battle, Arianit Komneni won a glorious victory." With these victories Gjergj Arianiti expanded his domains up to the city of Manastir.

Arianit used the classic tactic of "Pulling the enemy in, preparing the trap and striking suddenly." Arianiti also destroyed a second army sent by Ali Beg, leaving hundreds dead in the valleys of Kuç all the way to Borsh. The failure of the second Ottoman expedition became known throughout Europe, which was used to hearing about Christian defeats in the East. The joyful states of Europe – Pope Eugene IV, Alfonso V, Emperor Sigsimund, Venice and Ragusa – promised aid. In his third battle (1434), in order to recapture Vlorë and Kanina, Arianiti used numbers, expediency and his tactics. Arianiti was known as the "protector of freedom" throughout the European kingdoms. During the Ottoman campaigns of 1435 and 1436 Ali Beg, together with Turakhan Beg, effected a partial submission of the Albanians, Arianiti retreated to the area of Skrapari and Tomorica, where he continued his war against the Ottoman Empire. Murad II felt compelled to tacitly grant him the area between Shkumbin and south of Vjosa river as his dominions and have a truce with him.

=== 1443–44 ===
In August 1443 Arianiti again rebelled against Ottomans, probably urged by pope Eugene IV or instigated by the news of defeat of Sihàb ed-Dîn Pasa. During the fall of 1443 and the winter of 1444 he led an army deep into Macedonia. During the same time, the Ottomans were routed at Niš and Skanderbeg deserted the Ottoman army and began another rebellion. Skanderbeg eventually allied with Gjergj Arianit and some other nobles from Albania and Zeta through the League of Lezhë. In May–July 1435 Bulgarian prince Fruzhin visited Albania and met Arianiti the leaders of the revolt, on a secret diplomat mission of emperor Sigismund.

=== 1449–51 ===
At the beginning of 1449, Skanderbeg and Arianiti approached the Venetians requesting their protection from the Ottomans. Venice opted for neutral approach, not to jeopardize peace with Ottomans, and refused their request. By 1449 Gjergj Arianiti left his alliance with Skanderbeg.

When Krujë was besieged by the Ottomans, the sixty-seven-year-old Gjergj Arianiti joined the battle and fought fiercely. Along with 3,000 warriors, he joined the anti-Venetian force which eventually defeated the Venetian army at Drin. He was one of the main commanders during the short siege of Durrës and the siege of Dagno. Some of his troops went as far as the gates of Shkodër. Thus, his interests were not harmed by Venice, who wished to incorporate the bay of Vlorë into its dominions.

Arianiti supported the recapture of Svetigrad with 4,000 men. During the two main engagements of the siege, Arianiti showed great bravery. During the siege, his brother was killed. The experience of Arianiti convinced Skanderbeg to marry Donika, Arianiti's daughter. The strong connections between the Kastrioti and Arianiti families were of great benefit to the Albanian cause.

In 1451 after Alfonso signed the Treaty of Gaeta with Skanderbeg, he signed similar treaties with Gjergj Arianiti and other chieftains from Albania: Ghin Musachi, George Strez Balšić, Peter Spani, Pal III Dukagjini, Thopia Musachi, Peter of Himara, Simon Zenevisi and Carlo Tocco.

=== 1460–62 ===
He brought together his last resistance force between 1460 and 1462. In an open front, Mehmet II ordered movements into Albania to engage a group of Arianiti's warriors. He then surrounded Gjergj Arianiti by moving through the valley of Furka all the way through Shushicë. Fierce engagements began, but Sopoti was not captured and the Ottoman encirclement failed. The people compared Gjergj Arianiti to Skanderbeg. To celebrate this victory, the army was taken to Galigat after the Ottomans had fully left Albania. However, when the Ottomans heard of this, they traveled back to Albania at night. The fortress of Sopot, left with a garrison chosen by Arianiti, still could not be taken. Only through bribery and treachery was it possible for the castle be taken. The Ottoman commander took advantage of Arianiti's absence by launching a large attack with his main army. The Ottomans soon entered the castle, and in revenge for the defeats they had suffered, the entire population was massacred.

== Possessions ==
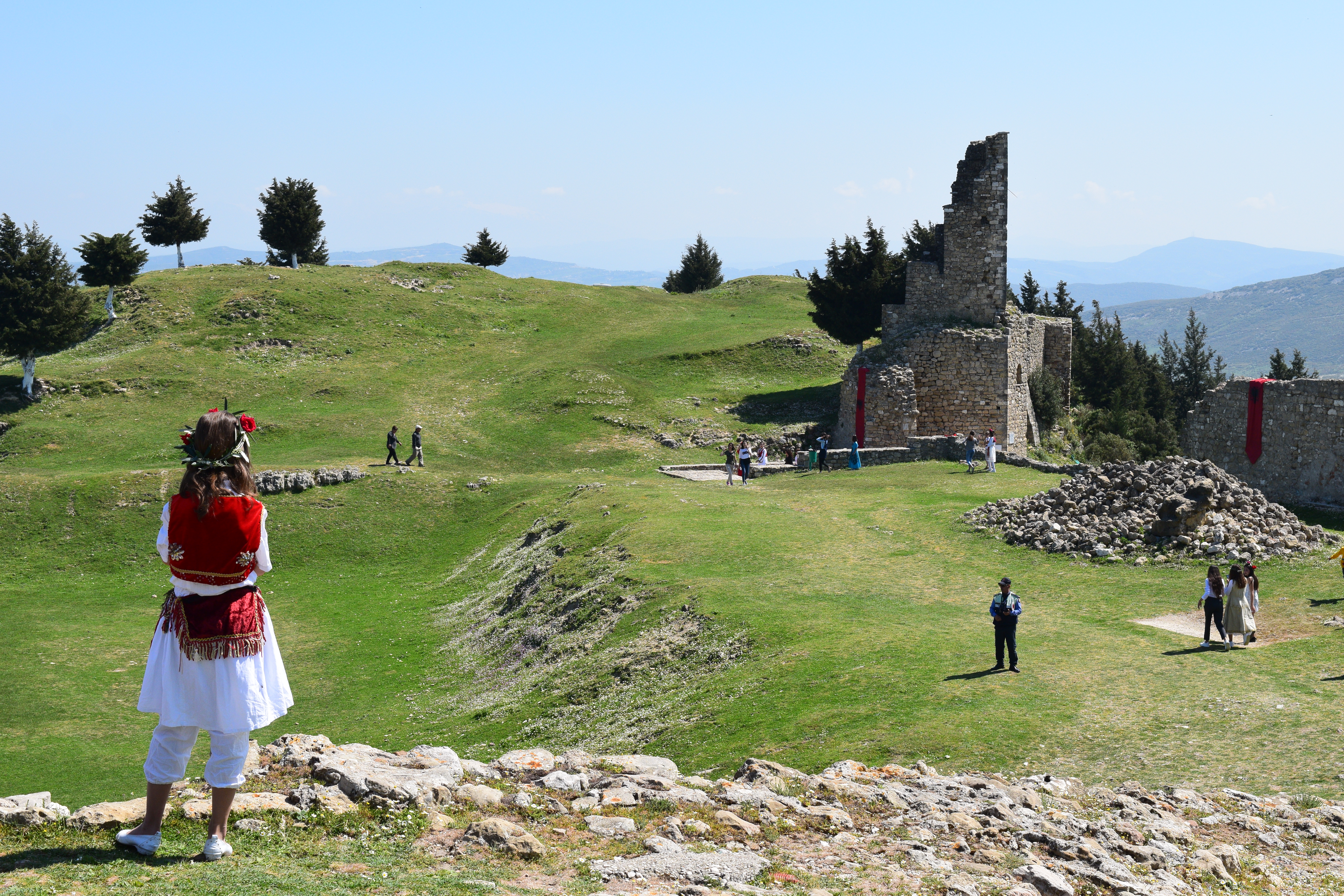
Kaninë Castle served as one of Gjergj Arianiti's capitals

Arianiti was the only Albanian leader to have two capitals: one near the coast in Kanina, and another near the eastern mountains in Sopot. His dominions acted as the first defense against many of the Ottoman expeditions and served as one of the main centers of the League of Lezhë. The union between the Kastrioti and Arianiti did not have much effect due to the exposed territories of Arianiti.

== Family ==
His first marriage was to Maria Muzaka, daughter of Andrea III Muzaka and Anna Chiranna Zenevisi, with whom he had eight daughters. After her death, Gjergj Arianiti married Lady Pietrina Francone, daughter of the Italian noble Oliver Francone. The couple had five more children.

From his first marriage (c.1420s–1440s) with Maria Muzaka, Arianiti had the following issue:

- Andronika, more commonly known by the nickname Donika, married Skanderbeg, Lord of Albania in 1448. She is traditionally regarded as Albania's first Queen Consort. Such title, however, would officially be held only by Géraldine Apponyi de Nagy during Zog I's reign. Donika and Skanderbeg had one son, John Castriot II, Duke of San Pietro in Galatina, who married Princess Irene Brankovich, the daughter of Serbian Despot Lazar Branković.
- Voisava, Lady of Zeta married Ivan I of Zeta with whom she had two sons, George and Stanislaus of Zeta.
- Chiranna, married Nicholas Pal Dukagjini. At the time of her marriage she was 14 or 15 years old, while the groom might have been between 14 and 20 years of age. The couple had one son who survived into adulthood, Progon Dukagjini.
- Helena, was the wife of George III Dukagjini. Many of the couple's children, such as Nicholas III, allied with the Ottomans later in life. Another son, named Scanderbeg is mentioned in Gjon Muzaka's Chronicles to have been still alive by 1515, ruling as a Sanjakbey.
- Despina, was married to Lord Tanush IV Dukagjini. They had two children: a son that died young and a daughter, Theodora. The latter's sons were the Lords Blaise and Jacob.
- Angjelina, who married Stefan Branković, son of Despot Đurađ Branković. Angjelina and Stefan had two sons and one daughter. Their eldest son Đorđe Branković was the titular Despot of Serbia from 1486 until his monastic vows in 1496. Angjelina's only daughter Princess Maria of Serbia, married Boniface III, Marquis of Montferrat, with whom she had: William IX, Marquis of Montferrat and John George, Marquis of Montferrat. Angjelina is venerated as saint by Orthodox Church.
- Komita (or Komnina), married Goico Balsha, Lord of Misia. The couple had two sons, who died in Hungary. Their daughter Maria Balsha, Countess of Muro married Giacomo Alfonso Ferrillo, with whom she had two daughters. The first daughter, Beatrice, married Prince Ferdinand Orsino, Duke of Gravina, while the other, Isabella, married Louis of Gesualdo, Count of Conza. Both daughters inherited their father's titles in their own right.
- Catherine, after the death of her first husband Andrew Spani married Niccolò Boccali, a nobleman from Venice who held the title of Baron in Morea. The couple's children were Lord Manoli Boccali, Lord Constantine Boccali and Lady Maria who married Giacomo de Pagnanin. Moreover, John Muzaka mentions further unnamed daughters married to Hungarian noblemen.

From Gjergj Arianiti's second marriage to Pietrina Francone (c.1440s) the following children were born:

- Theodora Arianiti
- Maria, married to Bartolomeo Giuppo della Rovere (1474–1545) from the Ligurian noble Della Rovere family. They had a son, Francesco della Rovere, who initially became Bishop of Camerino (1508), Voltera (1514) and finally Archbishop of Benevento (1530–1545).
- Thomas Arianiti
- Constantine, who became a leader among Christian Balkan refugees in Italy and used the titles Prince of Macedonia, Duke of Achea and Despot of Morea. In the early 16th century, Constantine served as a diplomat to the popes and the future Maximilian I, Holy Roman Emperor, with both parties finding him a talented ambassador. In 1489 he married Lady Francesca of Montferrat, member of the Palaeologus-Montferrat family, branch of the Byzantine Imperial Palaiologos dynasty, and a step-daughter to his niece Maria of Serbia. From 1495 to 1499 he became regent of Montferrat, on behalf of the young William IX, his brother-in law and grand-nephew. With Francesca, Constantine had the following children:
  - Arianitto, Prince of Macedonia
  - Andronica, married to Carlo III Tocco then after his death to Giorgio Secco, a milanese nobleman.
  - Penthesilea, married to Alexander Ducagjini
  - Ippolita, married to Zanobi de' Medici of the Italian Medici family, upon whose death in 1529 Pope Clement VII bestowed on her the right to inherit from him for life the title of Countess of Verucchio and Scorticata. She remarried in 1532 to Lionello Pio da Carpi of the Pio di Savoia family.
  - Polissena, married Rinaldo degli Ottoni di Matelica.
  - Deianira, married Giorgio Trivulzio.
  - Elena, married Juan de Luna, a Castilian nobleman.
- Lord Arianitto Arianiti

== See also ==
- Epitaph of Gllavenica
