= Maria of Serbia, Marchioness of Montferrat =

Princess of Serbia, Marchioness of Montferrat
- Born: 1466
- Died: 27 August 1495 (aged 28–29)
- Noble family: Branković dynasty Palaiologos
- Spouse: Boniface III, Marquess of Montferrat
- Issue: William IX, Marquess of Montferrat; John George, Marquess of Montferrat
- Father: Stefan Branković
- Mother: Angjelina Arianiti

Maria of Serbia or Marija Branković (Serbian Cyrillic: Марија Бранковић; 1466 – 27 August 1495) was Princess of Serbia by birth, and Marchioness of Montferrat by marriage. She was regent of Montferrat during the minority of her son in 1494-1495.

She was daughter of despot Stefan Branković of Serbia and the Albanian Princess Angjelina Arianiti. In 1485, she married Boniface III, Marquess of Montferrat.

== Biography ==
Since 1459, when Serbia fell under Ottoman rule, Maria's father, Despot Stefan Branković, was living in exile, mainly in northern Italy, where Maria was born in 1466. In 1485, she married Boniface III Palaiologos, marquess of Montferrat, who fell ill in 1493, and Maria became regent. Boniface died in 1494, and his widow continued to act as regent since their sons were still minor. Maria died in 1495.

Maria and Boniface had two sons: William IX (1486-1518), who became Marquess of Montferrat between 1494 and 1518, and John George (1488-1533) who became the last Marquess of Montferrat, between 1530 and 1533.

== Sources ==
- Ćirković, Sima (2004). The Serbs. Malden: Blackwell Publishing. ISBN 9781405142915.
- Haberstumpf, Walter (2009). Regesti dei Marchesi di Monferrato (secoli IX-XVI). Alessandria: San Giorgio Editrice. ISBN 9788876790935.
- Ruggiero, Michele (1979). Storia del Piemonte. Torino: Piemonte in Bancarella.

== Ancestry ==
Ancestors of Maria of Serbia, Marchioness of Montferrat

16. Branko Mladenović
8. Vuk Branković
4. Đurađ I Branković
18. Lazar I Hrebeljanović
9. Maria Lazarević
19. Milica Nemanjić
2. Stefan Branković
20. Demetrios I Kantakouzenos
10. Theodore Palaiologos Kantakouzenos
5. Irene Kantakouzene
11. Euphrosyne Palaiologina
1. Marija Branković
12. Komnen Arianiti
6. Gjergj Arianiti
26. Nikollë Zaharia
13. Nikollë Zaharia's daughter
3. Angjelina Arianiti
28. Gjin I Muzaka
14. Andrea III Muzaka
29. Zanfina Arianiti
7. Maria Muzaka
30. Gjon Zenebishi
15. Chiranna Zenebishi
31. Irene Bua Shpata
