= Maria Muzaka =

Albanian princess (c. 1410 – 1440s)

- Princess of Arianiti
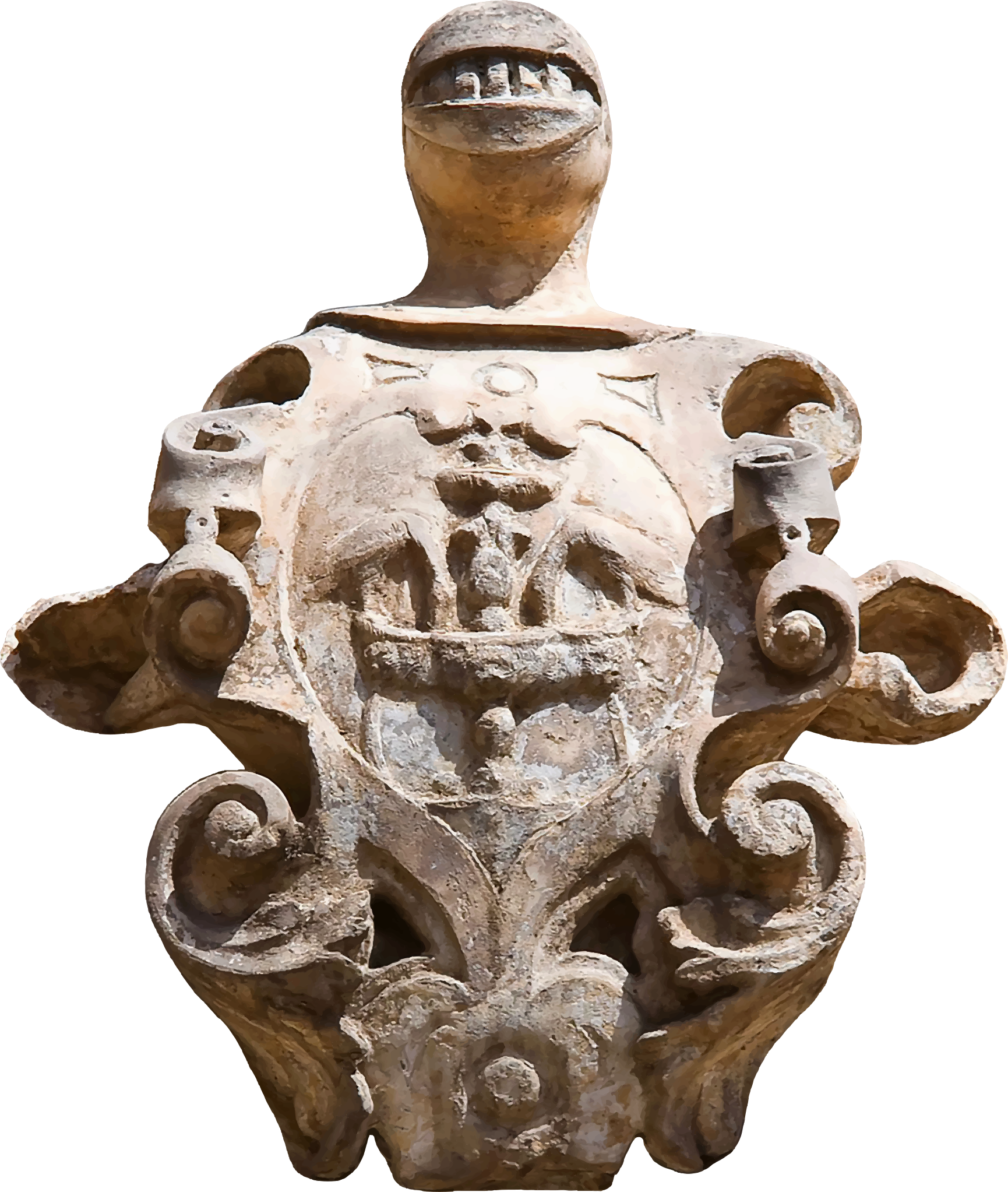
- Coat of arms of the Muzaka Despotate

Princess consort of Arianiti
- Tenure: c. 1420s - 1440s
- Predecessor: daughter of Nicholas Zaharia
- Successor: Pietrina Francone
- Born: c. 1410s Principality of Muzaka (today Southern Albania)
- Died: c. 1440s
- Spouse: Gjergj Arianiti
- Issue: Andronika, Lady of Albania; Voisava, Princess of Zeta; Chiranna, Princess of Ducagini; Helena, Princess of Ducagini; Despina, Princess of Ducagini; Saint Angjelina, Despotess of Serbia; Comita, Lady of Misia; Catherine, Lady of Drivasto
- House: Muzaka (paternally) Zenevisi (maternally) Arianiti (by marriage)
- Father: Andrea III Muzaka
- Mother: Chiranna Zenevisi, Lady of Grabossa
- Religion: Eastern Orthodoxy

Maria Muzaka was an Albanian princess from the Muzaka family. She was a daughter of Andrea III Muzaka and his wife Chiranna Zenevisi, Lady of Grabossa. From her marriage to Gjergj Arianiti, Maria had eight daughters, most notable of them being Andronika, Lady of Albania, and Saint Angjelina, Despotess of Serbia.

== Early life ==
When it comes to Maria Muzaka's early life, written documents are limited. She is thought to have been born around the 1410s in the prominent Muzaka family. They were rulers of the Principality of Muzaka in southern Albania.

Her father was Prince Andrea III Muzaka, son of Gjin I Muzaka and Lady Suina Arianites Comneniates. Her mother, Chiranna "Anna" Zenevisi, is mentioned in Gjon Muzaka's Chronicles as Lady of Grabossa and a daughter of Giovanni Sarbissa (alb. Gjon Zenebishi), from the Zenevisi family who ruled Epirus, Zagoria and Argirocastron.

Maria was the eldest daughter of the couple. She had two brothers Gjin II and Theodore III, as well as a younger sister, Lady Helena.

== Marriage and issue ==
Maria Muzaka married Gjergj Arianiti, ruler of the Arianiti Principality. The couple had eight daughters:

- Andronika, known by her family as Donika, married Albania's national hero George Castriot Skanderbeg. They had one son, John II, 1st Duke of San Pietro in Galatina.
- Voisava, married Ivan Crnojević, Prince of Zeta with whom she had sons Đurađ, Stefan and Staniša, better known as Skenderbeg. According to John Muzaka, Ðurađ had three daughters and two sons: Salomone, who died young, and Costantino, who married a Venetian noblewoman. Two of the daughters were married in Hungary, while one was married in Venice. As for Skenderbeg, Muzaka mentions how he "became a Turk", meaning converted to Islam, and continued ruling over his brother's lands.
- Chiranna, married Nicholas Ducagini with whom she had two sons. One of them died young, while the other was appointed a Pasha and a Grand Captain by the Ottomans.
- Helena, married George Ducagini with whom she had many children, all of which "turned Turk". John Muzaka mentions one son, Scanderbego, a "Sangiacco", as being still alive during the time he wrote the chronicles.
- Despina, married Tanusso Ducagini. The couple had one son who died young and a daughter, Theodora Ducagini. The latter went on to have two sons, Blasio and Jacob.
- Angjelina, married Stefan Branković, Despot of Serbia. The couple had three children who survived into adulthood: Đorđe, Jovan and Maria, Marchioness of Montferrat. For her pious life she was proclaimed a Saint and is venerated by the Serbian Orthodox Church as Venerable Mother Angelina.
- Comita, married Coico Balsha, Lord of Misia. They had one daughter Maria Balsha, Countess of Muro and two sons who died in Hungary. From her marriage to Italian Count Giacomo Alfonso Ferrillo, Maria Balsha had two daughters: Beatrice, married to Ferrante Orsino, Duke of Gravina and Isabella, married to Luise de Gesualdo, Count of Conza. Both daughters inherited their father's properties of Muro and Montefredane in their own right, respectively.
- Caterina, firstly married to Andrea Spani then to Italian nobleman Nicolò Boccali. They had two sons, Emanuele and Costantino, as well as two daughters, Maria and Caterina. Maria Boccali went on to marry Captain Mercurio Bua .

After her death, around the 1440s, Arianiti married Italian noblewoman Pietrina Francone, with whom he went on to have five more children. One of his daughters with Francone was named Maria in her honor.

== Legacy ==
Maria's eldest daughter, Andronika, is traditionally recognised as the first Albanian Queen through her marriage to Albania's national hero George Castriot Scanderbeg.

Another one of her daughters, Angjelina, is recognised as a Saint by the Serbian Orthodox Church, where she is known as "Saint Angjelina of Serbia" and "Mother Angjelina".

== Ancestry ==
Ancestors of Maria Muzaka

8. Andrea II Muzaka
4. Gjin I Muzaka
9. Euphemia Mataranga
2. Andrea Muzaka III, Lord of Deabolis
Materango Arianiti Comnenus
5. Zanfina Arianiti Comninata
1. Maria Muzaka
6. John Zenevisi, Sebastokrator of Epirus
3. Chiranna Zenevisi, Lady of Grabossa
14. Gjin Bua Shpata
Lady Bua Spata
15. Irene Preljubović

== Sources ==
- Elsie, Robert (24 December 2012). A Biographical Dictionary of Albanian History. I.B.Tauris. ISBN 978-1-78076-431-3.
- Elsie, Robert (2003). "1515 | John Musachio: Brief Chronicle on the Descendants of our Musachi Dynasty". www.albanianhistory.net. Archived from the original on 2016-03-04.
