= Count of Conza =

Count of Conza was a Renaissance title held by several noble families of the Campania region in southern Italy, notably the Balvano, Gesualdo, and Mirelli families. The title was often held along with others, such as Prince of Venosa located in Venosa, Italy.

== List of counts of Conza ==
- Sansone II, Count of Conza, 1430–1503, 1st Count of Conza
- Nicola III, Count of Conza, 2nd Count of Conza (son of Sansone)
- Luigi III, Count of Conza, 3rd Count of Conza (son of Sansone)
- Fabrizio I, Count of Conza, 4th Count of Conza (son of Luigi)
- Luigi IV, Count of Conza, 5th Count of Conza (son of Fabrizio)
- Fabrizio II, Count of Conza, 6th Count of Conza (son of Luigi IV)
- Carlo Gesualdo, 1566–1613, 7th Count of Conza (son of Fabrizio II)
- Emanuele, Count of Conza, 8th Count of Conza (son of Carlo)
- Isabella, Countess of Conza, died 1629, Countess of Conza (daughter of Emanuele)
