= Donika Kastrioti =

15th century Albanian Queen

Andronika Arianiti
- Lady of Albania

Lady of Albania
- Tenure: 1451–1468
- Predecessor: Voisava Kastrioti (as Lady of Mat)
- Successor: Theodora Muzaka
- Born: 1428; Kaninë, Ottoman Empire (modern day Albania)
- Died: 1506 (Aged 78); Valencia, Kingdom of Valencia
- Burial: Royal Monastery of the Holy Trinity
- Spouse: Skanderbeg (m. 1451; died 1468)
- Issue: Gjon Kastrioti II
Names
- Andronika Arianiti Comninata
- House: Arianiti (paternally); Muzaka (maternally); Kastrioti (by marriage)
- Father: Gjergj Arianiti
- Mother: Maria Muzaka
- Religion: Eastern Orthodoxy

Andronika Arianiti, commonly known as Donika Kastrioti, (1428 – 1506) was an Albanian noblewoman and Lady of Albania from her marriage to Skanderbeg. She was the daughter of Gjergj Arianiti, an earlier leader in the ongoing revolt against the Ottomans, and Maria Muzaka, whose family ruled under the title of despots in the southern part of the country.

== Life ==
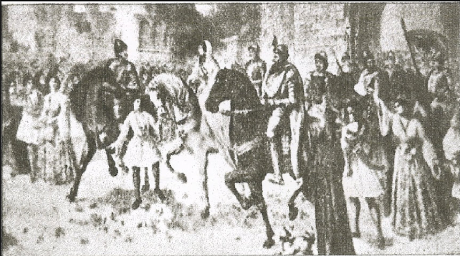
The wedding of Donika and Skanderbeg in 1451

Donika was born in Kaninë, in 1428. Her father, Gjergj Arianiti was a member of the Arianiti family whose domain stretched across the Shkumbin valley and the old Via Egnatia road and reached to the east today's Bitola. Her mother, Maria Muzaka was a member of the Muzaka family whose domain was the Myzeqe region.

A month after the Treaty of Gaeta, on 21 April 1451, Skanderbeg married Donika, and thus strengthened the ties with the Arianiti family, in the Albanian Orthodox Ardenica Monastery, in Lushnje, present-day southwestern Albania.

After the Ottoman conquest of Albania, the Kastriotis were given peerage in the Kingdom of Naples. They obtained a feudal domain, the Duchy of San Pietro in Galatina and the County of Soleto (Province of Lecce, Italy). Gjon Kastrioti II, Donika's and Skanderbeg's only child, married Jerina Branković, the daughter of Lazar Branković, Despot of Serbia, and niece of Mara Branković wife of Sultan Murad II.

== Notes ==
1. Her name is mentioned as Andronica Comneniates in Gjon Muzaka's work about the Muzaka family. Oliver Jens Schmitt names her Andronika Arianiti in his biographical work on Skanderbeg.
