= Komnen Arianiti =

Albanian nobleman of the 14th century

- Born: Central Albania
- Noble family: Arianiti
- Issue: Gjergj Arianiti; Muzakë Arianiti; Vladan Arianiti; Possibly Niketa Thopia’s wife.
- Occupation: Vassal of the Republic of Venice

Komnen Arianiti (fl. 1392–1407) was an Albanian nobleman of the Arianiti family, who held an area in central Albania around Durrës. His son Gjergj became a prominent leader of the Albanian-Ottoman wars.

== Life ==
The Albanian Academy treats him as the same person as Comin Spata (Albanian: Komin Spata), who was mentioned between 1392 and 1407. That name appears in the Venetian archives. Gjergj Arianiti was also mentioned in contemporary documents as Aranit Spata, because one of the ancestors of Komnen Arianiti was a member of Bua family. Unclear is also his relation to the Komnenos dynasty; he may have descended from a paternal female ancestor who belonged to that imperial family and lived in the early-to-mid 13th century, or adopted the name as other Arianiti kinsmen had in order to strengthen his claims.

His domains are mentioned in contemporary Venetian sources as areas located in the vicinity of Durazzo (Durrës) (in partibus Durrachii).

== Family ==
According to Franz Babinger and Lindsay L. Brook, Arianiti was certainly married to a daughter of Nicolò Sevati; while according to Dhimitër Shuteriqi, a daughter of Nikollë Zaharia. He had three sons who were named Gjergj, Muzakë (father of Moisi Golemi) and Vladan; and a daughter who was married to Niketa Thopia (according to Dhimitër Shuteriqi) or Pal Dukagjini (according to Skënder Anamali).

- Gjergj Arianiti, Albanian lord
- Muzakë Arianiti, father of Moisi Golemi.
- Vladan Araniti (or Vladin Arianites), married Angelina Kastrioti.
- Daughter, married Niketa Thopia or Pal Dukagjini
