= Chiranna Zenevisi, Lady of Grabossa =

Medieval Albanian noblewoman of the Zenevisi family

Chiranna Zenevisi Kirana Zenebishi
- Lady of Grabossa
- Born: 14th century Zagoria, Principality of Sarbissa (modern day Albania)
- Died: 15th century Principality of Muzaka (modern day Albania)
- Burial: Saint Mary's Church, Korçë
- Spouse: Andrea III Muzaka
- Issue: Gjin II Muzaka; Maria, Princess of Arianiti; Theodore III; Helena, Lady of Ragusa
- House: Zenevisi (by birth); Muzaka (by marriage)
- Father: Gjon Zenebishi
- Mother: Lady Bua Shpata
- Religion: Eastern Orthodox

Chiranna Zenevisi (Albanian: Kirana Zenebishi), also known as Anna, was an Albanian noblewoman and member of the Zenevisi family, as the daughter of Count John Zenevisi.

== Life ==
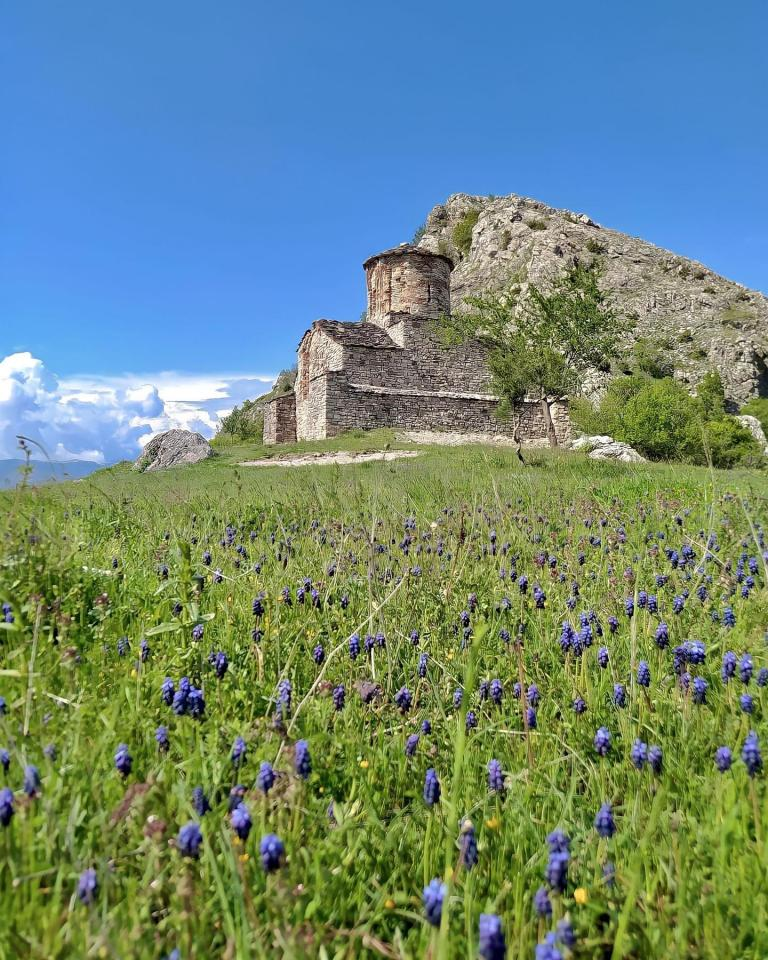
Church of the Holy Trinity in Lavdar built by Chiranna Zenevisi

Chiranna Zenevisi was the daughter of Gjon Zenebishi, Serbastokrator of Epirus. Her mother Bua was a daughter of Gjin Bua-Spata and sister of Irene, wife of Esau de' Buondelmonti. Not much is known about Chiranna's early life.

Upon her marriage to Andrea III Muzaka, Chiranna received the territory of Grabossa as part of her dowry from her father, John Zenevisi. Through this marriage, the territory became part of the holdings of the Muzaka family, and Chiranna assumed the title of Lady of Grabossa.

In 1470, Chiranna built the Holy Trinity Church, Lavdar. Her son, Gjin II, built Saint Mary's Church in Bungë, near the village of Zerec. He was buried on the south side of Saint Mary's Church. The church was built just a few kilometers from Lavdar, where the Holy Trinity Church is located. Later on, her descendants built another church dedicated to Saint George in the nearby Arostë.

Upon her death, Chiranna Zenevisi was buried on the west side of Saint Mary’s Church, where she was laid to rest alongside her daughter-in-law, Chiranna Mataranga, who was the wife of her son, Gjin II.

== Family ==
Chiranna Zenevisi married Andrea III Muzaka. The couple had four children:

1. Gjin II, married Chiranna Mataranga, father of Gjon Muzaka.
2. Maria Muzaka, married Gjergj Arianiti. The couple had eight children, the most famously known Donika Kastrioti.
3. Teodor III, who became his father's successor and participated in various battles against the Ottomans, eventually co-founding the League of Lezhë. His son, Yakup Bey Muzaka converted to Islam and Teodor was succeeded by his elder brother Gjin II Muzaka.
4. Helena Muzaka, married Lord Philip of Ragusa.
