= Holy Trinity Church, Lavdar =

Church in Albania

Holy Trinity Church
- Kisha e Shën Triadhës
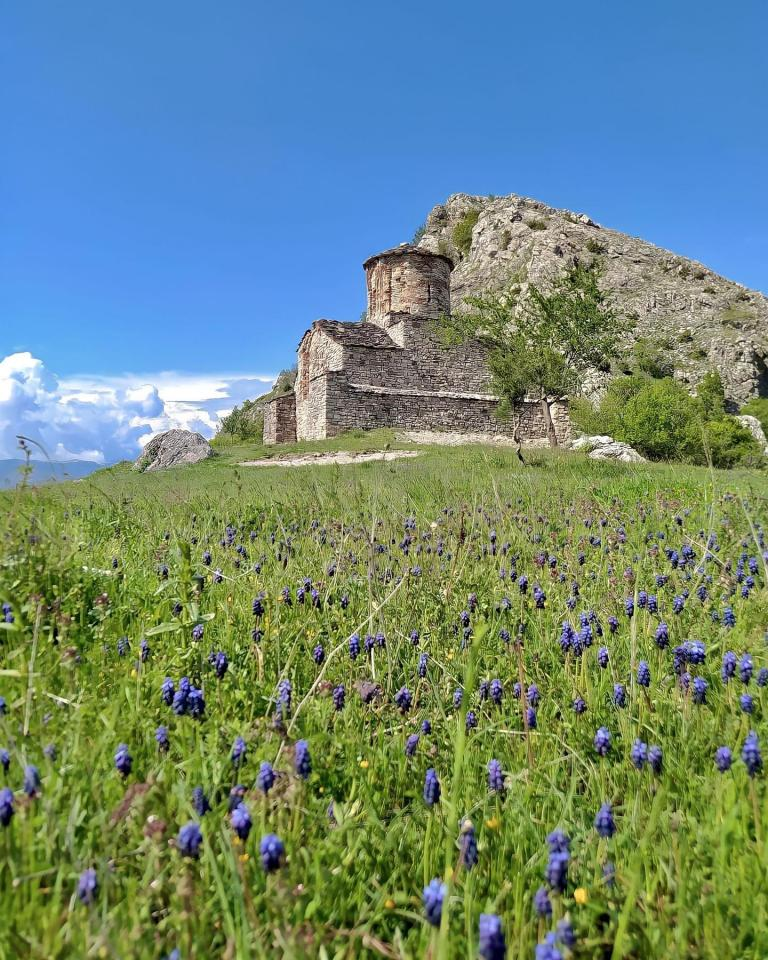
- The Holy Trinity Church and Tudas Rock

Religion
- Affiliation: Eastern Orthodox
- Leadership: Albanian Orthodox Church

Location
- Location: Tudas, Korçë county, Albania
- Interactive map of Holy Trinity Church
- Coordinates: 40.6209°N 20.5033°E

Architecture
- Type: Church
- Style: Byzantine architecture (Crossed-dome plan)
- Founder: Chiranna Zenevisi, Lady of Grabossa
- Completed: 1470
- Materials: stone
- Cultural Monument of Albania
- Designated: 15.01.1963

Holy Trinity Church of Lavdar (Albanian: Kisha e Shën Triadhës në Lavdar), also known as the Holy Trinity Church of Tudas is a 15th-century Albanian orthodox church built in the Byzantine style by the medieval Albanian noble family of Muzaka. It is located near the villages Lavdar and Tudas in the region of Opar in Korçë county, southeastern Albania. Noted for its distinguished architecture and frescoes, it was declared a Cultural Monument of Albania in 1963.

== Location ==
The church is located in a remote setting in the region of Opar in Korçë county, southeastern Albania. It lies at 1220 m altitude, at the feet of Tudas Rock (Albanian: Shkëmbi i Tudasit) and 500 m from the eponymous, nearest village, on the northern slope of Mt. Ostrovica (2383 m). The second nearest but larger village to the church is Lavdar, of the municipal unit of Lekas. The memoirs of Gjon Muzaka, being the earliest documented accounts of the church, mention it as the Holy Trinity Church of Lavdar, near the village Xerje.

== History ==
The Holy Trinity Church of Lavdar was built in 1470 by Chiranna (Kiranna) Muzaka, daughter of John Zenevisi, a powerful Albanian lord of Epirus. She married Andrea III Muzaka of the Muzaka noble family and had a son, named Gjin. Gjin II Muzaka also built the Saint Mary church in Bungë (English: Sessile oak forest) near the village Zerec, few km from Lavdar. He was buried by this church, as were his wife and his mother Chiranna. In the same fashion, their descendants built another church dedicated to Saint George in the nearby Arostë (Erosto).

A representative of the Muzaka family was mentioned since 1090 by Anna Komnene, as a trusted commander of the Byzantine emperor Alexios I Komnenos, while in the years 1382–84, Teodor II Muzaka and his brother Stoya, both uncles of Andrea III Muzaka, had founded a new church in Kastoria, dedicated to St. Athanasius. In his Memoirs of 1515, Gjon Muzaka, Chiranna's grandson and Gjin's son, describes his family as devout Christians. Following the Siege of Shkodra in 1479 and the Ottoman conquest, Gjon Muzaka left Albania with his family and went into exile in Italy. With the islamization of Albania in the later years, a part of the population turned to Islam, resulting in a religiously mixed community, but the toponymy of the region didn't change and often reflects a Christian origin. The Holy Trinity Church was preserved, functional and venerated by both the Christian and the Muslim local community. At certain days, many Muslim believers from the nearby villages paid visit to the church, donated money and even kissed the orthodox icons. Besides the frescoes, there is an 18th-century inscribed icon inside the church, a gift dedicated to Chiranna by a certain Simo Theodhor.

On January 15, 1963 the Holy Trinity Church of Lavdar was declared a Cultural Monument of Albania. In a report of 1967, it was described as an abandoned church close to the Muslim village of Tudas, but it was noted for its distinguished architecture and frescoes and thus survived the state of atheism that was installed in Albania. In 2013, a restoration and structural rehabilitation project of the church was implemented by a joint cooperation of the Orthodox Metropolis of Korça, the Regional Directorate of the Monuments of Culture and the local government.

== Architecture ==
The Holy Trinity Church of Lavdar is an aisleless Byzantine church in the region of Opar. It has a cross-in-square plan, with a tholobate (drum shaped dome) rested on its pendentives, without columns. The interior is rich in frescoes of Byzantine iconography. A dry stone layer of masonry was added by the local stonemasons, few years after its construction.
