= Gjin II Muzaka =

15th–century Albanian nobleman

- Prince of Muzaka; Lord of Tomorrica; Lord of Deabolis
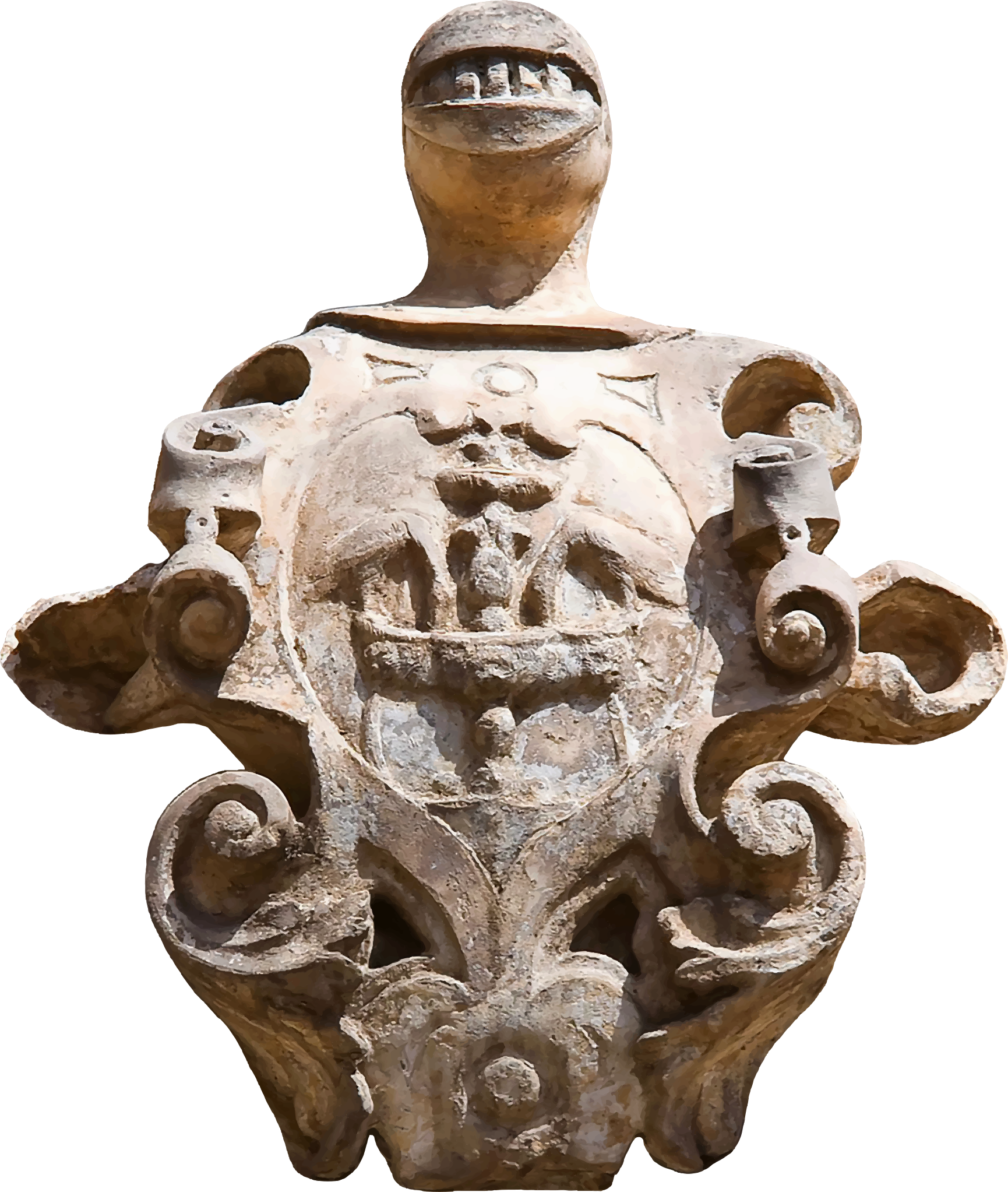
- Coat of arms of the Muzaka family

Prince of Muzaka
- Predecessor: Andrea III Muzaka
- Successor: Gjon Muzaka
- Born: Tomorrica, Principality of Muzaka
- Died: Mid-July 1445; Berat Castle, shortly after Siege of Berat
- Burial: Church of Saint Mary, Bungë
- Spouse: Chiranna Mataranga
- Issue: Gjon Muzaka; Andrea Muzaka; Suina Muzaka; Maria Muzaka, Lady of Biesca; Helena Muzaka; Comita Muzaka; Condisa Muzaka; Theodora Muzaka, Lady of Albania
- Dynasty: Muzaka
- Father: Andrea III Muzaka
- Mother: Chiranna Zenevisi
- Religion: Eastern Orthodoxy
- Occupation: Soldier in the League of Lezhe

Gjin II Muzaka was an Albanian nobleman and son of Andrea III Muzaka and Chiranna Zenevisi, Lady of Grabossa. His father came from the wealthy noble Muzaka family whilst his mother came from the noble Zenevisi family and was a daughter of Albanian lord John Zenevisi.

== Life ==
After the death of his father Andrea III, Gjin was the official heir to his father's throne and became the Lord of Tomorrica and Deabolis, bordering the domains of the noble Arianiti family. According to his son Gjon Muzaka in the Muzaka chronicles, Gjin and his family alongside his mother Chiranna were all “devout christians”. During the League of Lezhë he joined the forces of Skanderbeg against the Ottoman Empire. He fought and died shortly after the siege of Berat in 1445 mid-July. His lands were ultimately taken by Skanderbeg until the end of his revolt where Gjin's son, Gjon Muzaka, an Albanian chronicler, inherited his father's land. This did not last long, as the Ottomans had expelled Gjon from his land and was forced to flee and take refuge in Italy.

== Burial ==
Like his mother Chiranna who built the Holy Trinity Church in Lavdar, Gjin was also a church builder and had constructed a church dedicated to Saint Mary in Bungë and was buried there with his wife Chiranna Zardari and also with his mother Chiranna Zenevisi. His descendants had also constructed a church dedicated to Saint George. Due to agriculture and farming, the ruins of the church were fully destroyed.

== Family ==
With his wife Chiranna, he had the following children:

- Gjon Muzaka, an Albanian chronicler who wrote the Muzaka chronicles which greatly contributed to the knowledge of Albanian medieval history.
- Andrea Muzaka, had a son named Lord Ginno.
- Suina Muzaka, married Lord Mosachi Comnino Arianiti with whom she had two sons, Lords Comnino and Araniti, and three daughters, only the youngest of which, Lady Yela, survived.
- Maria Muzaka, married Lord Mosachi Comnino Arianiti, known as Dangelino. He was the son of Skanderbeg's sister Angelina Kastrioti and Vladan Arianiti, Gjergj Arianiti's brother. According to Gjon Muzaka, Dangelino owned a castle in Biesca, as well as other properties in Cerminichi and Tamadia, of which four villas in Marguesi near Pagliola. The couple had one daughter, Lady Porfida Comninati Arianiti, who became part of Queen Joanna of Aragon's, court.
- Helena Muzaka married Lord Giorgio Blandisi Carles, with whom she had Lady Visava, another member of Queen Joanna's court.
- Comita Muzaka, married Lord Arianiti, son of Mosachi Arianiti, a baron in Cerminichi. All of their children, except one daughter, passed away.
- Condisa Muzaka, married Lord Duche, son of Lord Aidino, who ruled over Neppe and other territories in Spatinia.
- Lady Theodora Muzaka was firstly married to Lord Goisavo Balsha, brother to Gojko Balsha. He died without issue. Her second marriage was to Lekë III Dukagjini, however, the couple did not have any children together.
