= Kardhiq Castle =

- Kalaja e Kardhiqit
- near Kardhiq, Albania

Site information
- Type: Castle
- Controlled by: Zenebishi family Ottoman Empire; Albania
- Open to the public: Yes

Location
- Coordinates: 40.1246°N 20.0292°E

Site history
- Built: late 14th - early 15th century
- Built by: Gjon Zenebishi

Kardhiq Castle (Albanian: Kalaja e Kardhiqit) is a ruined Ottoman Turkish hill fortress located in Kardhiq, southern Albania. Built between the late 14th and the early 15th century by the Zenebishi family, it was restored by Ali Pasha in the early 19th century.

== History ==
The castle is first mentioned in the 1431–32 register of the Sanjak of Albania. The castle has five towers, two of which are of polygonal form and similar to other castles of Ali Pasha of Ioannina. The width of the walls, which feature turrets, is about 1.7 metres (5.6 ft).
