= Zagori, Albania =

Zagoria Zaguria, Zagurii
- Administrative unit
- Location within Albania
- Coordinates: 40°13′N 20°13′E
- Country: Albania
- County: Gjirokastër
- Municipality: Libohovë

Population (2011)
  - Administrative unit: 411
- Time zone: UTC+1 (CET)
  - Summer (DST): UTC+2 (CEST)
- Area Code: 0883

Zagoria (Aromanian: Zaguria or Zagurii) is a former municipality in the Gjirokastër County, southern Albania. During the 2015 local government reform, Zagoria became a subdivision of the municipality Libohovë. The population at the 2011 census was 411. Since 2018, the region has been at the centre of the expanded Zagoria Nature Park. Zagoria is also considered to be a distinct "ethnographic region" (Albanian: krahina etnografike), traditionally consisting of ten settlements: Sheper, Nivan, Ndëran, Topovë, Konckë, Hoshteve, Lliar, Vithuq, Doshnicë and Zhej.

== Etymology ==
The placename "Zagori" itself is derived from the Slavic Zagore meaning "beyond the mountains". But also has meaning in albanian language, meaning Za-Guri “Echoe from Stones”. The name is also found in a nearby region of Greece.

== Geography ==
The region is primarily defined by the Zagoria valley, which is 27 kilometres (17 mi) long with a watershed of 171 square kilometres (66 sq mi). Its highest point is Mount Nemërçkë at 2,485 metres (8,153 ft) above sea level, while the lowest is at 350 metres (1,150 ft). It is valued for its natural scenery and its pastoral traditions and includes the fields of Çajupi, Çajupi Mountain, and a twenty-meter-high waterfall called the "oars of Doshnica" (Albanian: Rrema e Doshnicës).

== Demographics ==
The municipality of Zagori has an Orthodox Albanian majority and an Aromanian minority. The municipality consists of the following villages: Sheper, Nivan, Konckë, Vithuq, Hoshtevë, Doshnicë, Zhej, Lliar, Topovë and Nderan. Konckë is inhabited by an Orthodox Albanian population. Doshnicë and Lliar are wholly populated by Orthodox Albanian Christians. The villages of Nderan, Nivan, Sheper, Topovë and Zhej are inhabited by Orthodox Albanians, and these villages contain some Aromanian families, while in Hoshtevë and Vithuq the Aromanian community is a significant minority population of the villages. Aromanian communities were part of the local population of Zagori in 1880, in particular in the villages of Topovë, Zhej and Lliarë. During the Communist era, a number of Aromanian families settled in some villages of Zagori as part of the resettlement policies of the People's Republic of Albania.

Its people practised endogamy by intermarrying within their group, although occasionally the Greeks of Pogoni would marry a bride from the area and teach her Greek. The population of Zagori has dialectal and cultural characteristics of both the Lab and Tosk Albanian subgroups, though they also form a unique unit of their own, which traditionally does not marry with people from the neighbouring krahina etnografike of Lunxhëria.

Its population is mostly Albanian-speaking, traditionally with an Eastern Orthodox Christian majority. It borders the regions of Lunxhëria to the west and Pogoni to the south. Historically, from Ottoman times when it was part of Tepelena kaza until 1920, Zagoria depended on Tepelena, but in 1920 it was instead subordinated to Përmeti, and then from 1924 until modern times, it has been subordinated to Gjirokastra.

== History ==
The region was first mentioned as Ζαγόρια in Greek (in an Old Bulgarian translation, it was rendered as Загорїа) The region was named in the rule of the First Bulgarian Empire in Albania.

The "Zenevias", probably the Zenebishi, are mentioned in 1304 as one of the families that were granted privileges by the Angevin Philip I, Prince of Taranto. According to Robert Elsie, the family originated from the Zagoria region. Gjon Zenebishi was one of the most notable members of this Albanian noble family; he was born in Zagori. Between 1373 and 1414, he controlled Gjirokastër and its surroundings. After the Ottomans captured the region of Epirus, some members of the family fled to Morea, while other members held high positions within the Ottoman hierarchy. Gjon Zenebishi's descendants continued to live undisturbed in the mountains of Zagoria and eventually faded into history. Gjon established the Principality of Gjirokastër (1373–1418) which included Zagori. Gjon Zenebishi was appointed sebastocrator or prefect of Vagenetia near Delvina and in 1386 he became prince. Notable descendants of Gjon and this family include his sons, Thopia Zenebishi and Hamza Zenebishi, and his grandson, Simon Zenebishi.

In 1319-1414 the region was known as "Great Zagori" and was part of the Despotate of Epirus with its capital in Ioannina. In 1399, the Greek-speaking population of Great Zagori joined the Despot of Epirus, Esau, in his campaign against various Albanian tribesmen.

In 1431–1432, there were 188 families and 1600 inhabitants in total; by 1583, this number had grown to 3300, with Sheperi, the largest village, having 600 houses alone. The population growth in the intermittent period was driven by migrations into Zagoria, coming from Kolonja, Labëria, the region of Suli in Greece, and other areas. The incomers came in order to flee religious persecution as well as persecution by personal enemies or foreign invaders.

The population of Zagori also migrated to southern Italy during the 16th century, these people are referred to as the Arbereshe. They founded the village of Zagarise (Albanian: Zagari) it is an Arbëreshë village and comune in the province of Catanzaro in the Calabria region of southern Italy. They named it after the region they were from.

During the 17th century, Greek elementary schools were opened in the villages and monasteries of the region. Local Greek education was sponsored by the Orthodox communities and the guilds of Orthodox craftsmen.

During the era of conversions to Islam in the 18th century, Christian Albanian-speaking areas such as the region of Zagori strongly resisted those efforts, in particular the villages of Konckë and Sheper. Christianity was preserved in Zagori due to the contributions of various prominent scholars, such as the Greek Orthodox missionary Sophianos who preached in the villages of the area in the early 18th century.

In the mid-19th century, there were 4300 inhabitants of Zagoria. However, this peak population struggled with the limited space of Zagoria, the relative lack of natural resources, and difficulties such as bread shortages. These factors caused a large wave of emigration out of Zagoria. During the 18th to 20th centuries, 80 percent of males in Zagoria worked abroad (a custom known in the Albanian South as kurbet). The first major wave of permanent emigration occurred in the early 20th century, with Istanbul, Greece and Egypt being major destinations, while the United States and Canada soon became more popular as destinations; emigration to other parts of Albania was also extensive. Worldwide today, there are about 18,000 people paternally descended from traceable ancestors in Zagoria.

In World War II, Zagoria was a base for the Albanian partisans within Gjirokaster County, and two partisan brigades were created locally. Major meetings were also held in the area among Partisan leaders. The war saw 323 houses in Zagoria destroyed, 220 of which were rebuilt after the victory of the Partisans.

In the years following the war, new schools were built in the area, as were irrigation works, a local hospital and maternity center, and a cultural center. All villages were connected to the electricity grid by 1969. Today, however, many important services remain lacking in the area.

== Notable people ==
- Peco Kagjini, politician and mayor of Tirana
- Vito Kapo, politician
- Mihal Kasso, member and chairman of the Albanian Parliament.
- Pirro Kondi, politician, Politburo candidate-member
- Kiço Ngjela, Communist Albania politician.
- Anastas Ngjela, Albanian pilot of First Class and the Colonel of Albanian Air Forces.
- Aristidh Ruci, signatory of Albanian Declaration of Independence in 1912.
- Pluton Vasi, Albanian film director.
- Andon Zako Çajupi, poet and activist of the Albanian National Awakening
- Gjon Zenebishi, ruler of Gjirokastra in the early 15th century.
- Thopia Zenebishi (1379–1435) Albanian nobleman.
- Simon Zenebishi (fl. 1443–1461) Albanian aristocrat and vassal of the Kingdom of Naples.
- Hamza Zenebishi (fl. 1456–1460), Albanian Sanjakbey of the Sanjak of Mezistre.

== See also ==
- Protected areas of Albania
