= Jorgo Bulo =

Albanian philologist, historian, and literary critic

Prof. Dr, Jorgo Bulo
- Born: 27 April 1939; Sheper, Albania
- Died: 26 November 2015 (aged 76); Përmet, Albania
- Occupations: Academic, scholar
- Known for: Studime Filologjike; Albanian Academy of Sciences

Academic work
- Main interests: Philology
- Notable works: History of the Albanian People (2002); Albanian Encyclopedic Dictionary (2008)

Jorgo Bulo (27 April 1939 – 26 November 2015) was an Albanian philologist, historian, and literary critic. From 2003 to his death, he was a member of the Albanian Academy of Arts and Sciences.

Bulo was born on 27 April 1939 in Sheper, Zagori region of Gjirokastër District in Albania. He studied Albanian language and literature in the Faculty of History and Philology of the University of Tirana, graduating in 1960. In 1966 he started working as a scientific cooperator in the Institute of Linguistics and Literature in Tirana. He participated in the Orthography Congress of 1972, Albanian: Kongresi i Drejtshkrimit, where the orthographic rules of the Albanian language were standardized, and was a signatory. From 1972 to 2008 he was part of the editorial staff of the scientific magazine Studime Filologjike (Philological Studies), whilst editor-in-chief during 1997-2007. In 1986 he became Deputy Director, and in 1990 Director of the Institute of Linguistics and Literature, today's part of the Centre of Albanological Studies. In 1982 he received the title Dr. (Doctor of Philological Sciences), in 1994 As. Prof. (Associated Professor), and Professor (PhD) in 1998. In 2003 he was accepted as full member of the Albanian Academy of Sciences. Since 2000 Bulo was member of the task force for the "Albania, a patrimony of European values" project. Jorgo Bulo died of heart failure on 26 November 2015 in Përmet, Albania.

== Awards ==
- "Penda e Argjendtë" (Silver Feather), 1999
- "Faik Konica", 2008

== Publications ==
- Tradita dhe risi letrare (Traditions and innovations in literature), Shtëpia Botuese "Naim Frashëri", Tirana, 1981. OCLC 12693367
- Historia e letërsisë shqiptare: që nga fillimet deri te Lufta Antifashiste Nacionalçlirimtare (History of the Albanian Literature: From the beginning till the Anti-Fascist National Liberation Struggle) as Scientific Editor, Albanian Academy of Sciences, Tirana, 1983. OCLC 14167733
- Magjia dhe magjistarët e fjalës (Magic and magicians of the words), Shtëpia Botuese Dituria, Tirana, 1998. ISBN 9789992731321
- Kosova në vështrim enciklopedik (Kosovo in an encyclopedic perspective), as co-editor, Albanian Academy of Sciences, Tirana, 1999. ISBN 99927-1-170-1
- Tipologjia e lirikës së Naim Frashërit (Typology of the lyrics of Naim Frashëri), Albanian Academy of Sciences, Tirana, 1999. ISBN 99927-600-9-5
- Historia e Popullit Shqiptar (History of the Albanian People), as co-author, Albanian Academy of Sciences, Tirana, 2002. ISBN 99927-1-622-3
- Fjalori Enciklopedik Shqiptar (Albanian Encyclopedic Dictionary), as co-author and scientific editor, Albanian Academy of Sciences, Tirana, 2008. vol.I: ISBN 978-99956-10-27-2 / vol.II: ISBN 978-99956-10-28-9 / vol.III: ISBN 978-99956-10-32-6
- Shpirti i fjalës (The spirit of the word), Albanian Academy of Sciences, Tirana, 2004. ISBN 978-99943-1-962-6
