= Kisha e Shën Triadhës =

Kisha e Shën Triadhës may refer to:

- Kisha e Shën Triadhës (Berat)
- Kisha e Shën Triadhës (Korçë)
