= Alessio Spani =

15th-century Albanian noblemen

Alessio Spani or Lekë Shpani (1442–1495) was an Albanian nobleman. A member of the Spani family, which ruled Drivast, in the mid-15th century he settled in Venice and served as a diplomat of the republic in the Ottoman Empire.

== Family ==
A member of the Spani family he claimed that he was descended from several imperial Byzantine families. Gjon Muzaka in his Breve memoria de li discendenti de nostra casa Musachi (1510), wrote that Span was descended from the Theodosian dynasty. Instead, Andreas Angelos Komnenos in Constitutio Ordinis Constantiniani Equestris, claimed that Alexios III Angelos was Span's great-great-great-grandfather. The complete genealogy presented by him is the following:

- Alexius III Angelos, Byzantine Emperor from March 1195 to 17/18 July 1203
  - Alexios Andreas Posthumus (d. 1260), Dux and Comes of Drivasto
    - Michael Angelos (d. 1318), Comes of Drivasto
      - Andreas Angelos (d. 1366), Dux and Comes of Drivasto
        - Michael (d. 1465)
          - Andreas Angelos
          - Alessio Span (b. 1442–d. 1495)

Alessio acquired the surname Span from his mother Helen Span, who was the second wife of Michael.

In Muzaka's work, Elisabeta or Miliza Branković, daughter of Đurađ Branković, is mentioned as Span's wife. This was disputed by Franz Babinger on the account that Đurađ had only two daughters, Mara and Katarina. Muzaka informs us that Span had six children: Marco, Biasio, Lucia, Demetria, Angela and Andriana. Karl Hopf also presented a seventh child named Alessandro.

== Relations with Venice ==
Span's activities were closely related to the Venetian ones in Albania. Gabriel Trivisano, proveditor of Venice in Albania, includes Span in the group of the Albanian nobles that were favourable to Venice and informed him about the political conditions in Albania. Span played an important role as an intermediary during the peace negotiations between Venice and the Ottoman Empire represented by Mahmud Pasha in the late 1460s. For his services he received a stipend of 200 ducats per year and eventually incorporated a castle mentioned as Chiro into the Venetian area of control (Venetian Albania).
