= Kardhiq =

- Village
- Location within Albania
- Coordinates: 40°7′18″N 20°1′39″E
- Country: Albania
- County: Gjirokastër
- Municipality: Gjirokastër
- Administrative unit: Cepo
- Time zone: UTC+1 (CET)
  - Summer (DST): UTC+2 (CEST)

Kardhiq is a village in the former Cepo commune, Gjirokastër County, Albania. At the 2015 local government reform it became part of the municipality Gjirokastër. The village is inhabited by both Bektashi Muslim and Orthodox Christian Albanians who speak the Tosk dialect of Albanian. Kardhiq Castle is located near the village.

== Name ==
The toponym Kardhiq is used for several places in Albania. It is found in several places of the Balkans, in the form of Gardik, Gardiki (in Greece), Gradec. The toponym is of Slavic origin and stems from a word for "castle".

== History ==
A Hellenistic era garrison was built in Kardhiq as part of the fortification system of Chaonia, in the northwestern part of Epirus

In the late 14th century and early 15th century, the Kardhiq Castle was built by the noble Albanian Zenebishi. family. Kardhiq had around 30 households in 1431–1432. Ottoman explorer Evliya Çelebi recorded 150 homes in the 17th century.

In 1811, Kardhiq, whose inhabitants were known for their military prowess, had taken in one of Ali Pasha's political opponents, Ibrahim Pasha. Eventually, Ali managed to have the village hand over Ibrahim via presents and promises. In that same year, French agents had brought money and gunpowder to Gjirokastër in order to incite rebellion against Ali, whom the French had politically opposed. This rebellion was led by the chieftains of Kardhiq, Gjirokastër and Delvinë, and in October 1811, the rebels managed to inflict a heavy defeat on Ali's troops. Although the inhabitants of Gjirokastër eventually surrendered, the inhabitants of Kardhiq continued the resistance, and so Ali Pasha began a long siege of the village.

In December 1811, the men of Kardhiq offered to surrender on the condition that they be allowed to emigrate to Corfu; Ali refused, and the siege continued. On 21 February 1812, the village finally fell, with at least 300 defenders having been killed in the final assault. Ali Pasha ordered the massacre due to a long-standing vendetta he had with the village; it was said that after his father had died whilst Ali was a child and his family's power subsequently diminished, the men of Kardhiq captured his mother, raped her and humiliated her by forcing her to walk through the streets with a man on her back. As such, on 15 March 1812, Ali ordered that nearly 800 captives be taken to a roadside inn with a large courtyard. Some of the captives were taken away for slavery, but the vast majority were massacred in the courtyard. This massacre was carried out by Thanasis Vagias. During the massacre, Ali Pasha spared the family of an imam from Kolonjë due to his friendship with the man; the family consisted of about 30 men who were allowed to continue sowing the fields until they were eventually permitted to return and repopulate village. From then onwards, the village would recover well, and the Albanian inhabitants of Kardhiq were primarily engaged in mercenary activities during that period.

== Notable people ==
- Hasan Dosti,(1895 – January 29, 1991) Born in Kardhiq, he was a famous jurist and Balli Kombëtar leader
- Çerçiz Topulli,(20 September 1880 – 17 July 1915) Albanian revolutionary and guerrilla fighter involved in the national movement against the Ottoman occupation. His mother Hasije, daughter of Laze Mullai was from Kardhiq.
- Bajo Topulli (1868 – 24 July 1930), born Bajram Fehmi Topulli, was an Albanian nationalist figure of the Albanian National Awakening. Bajo was the older brother of Çerçiz Topulli. His mother Hasije, daughter of Laze Mullai was from Kardhiq.
