= Spani family =

Noble family from Albania

Spani Spanët
- Noble family
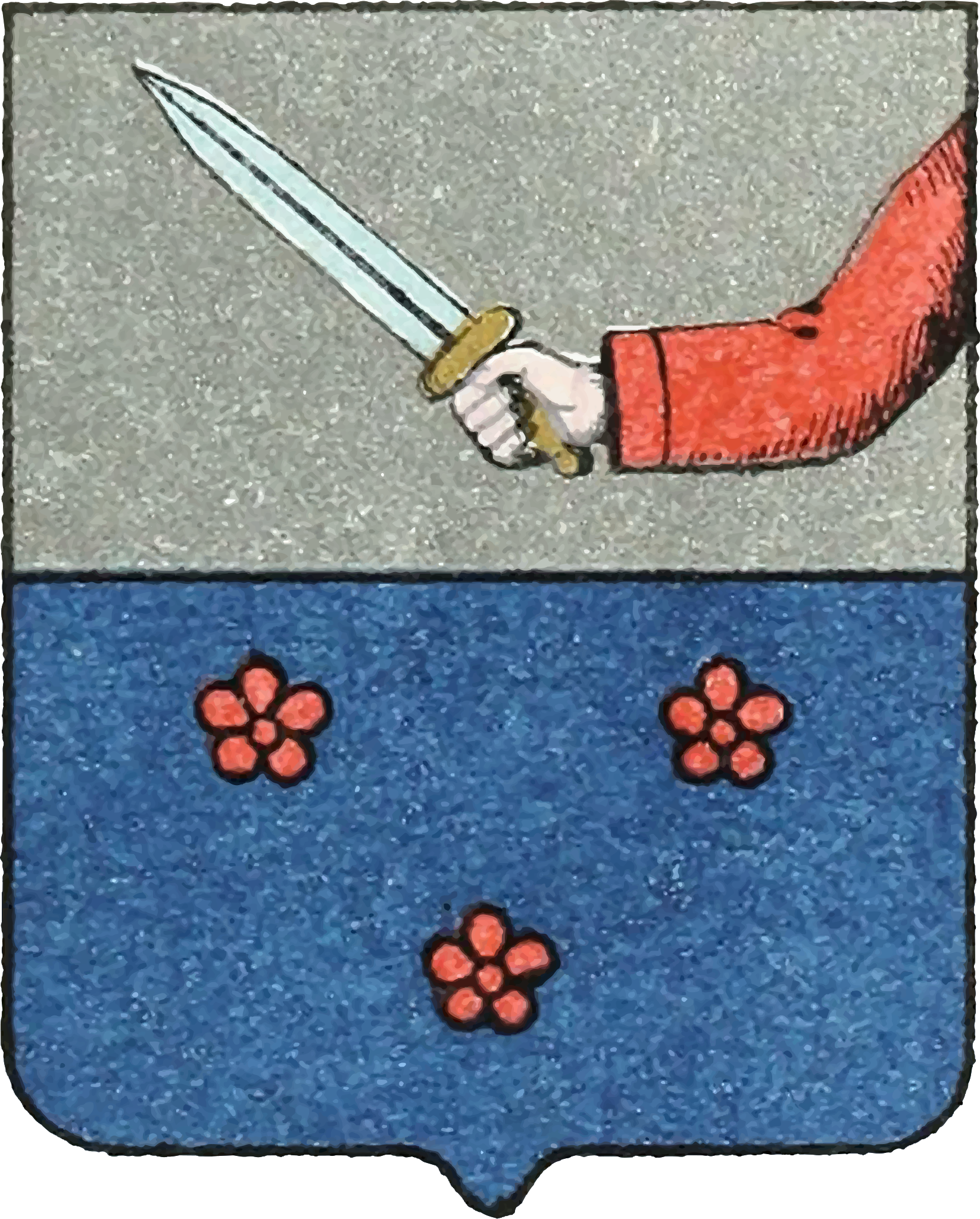
- Coat of arms of the Spani as depicted in F.A. Galvani's 1884 catalog
- Country: Medieval Albania
- Current region: Drivasto, Scutari
- Founded: 14th century
- Members: Peter Spani; Alessio Spani; Nicola Spanich
- Connected families: Cernovichio; Arianiti

The Spani family was a noble Albanian family that emerged in the 14th century. They owned large estates in and around the fortified town of Drivasto and in neighbouring Scutari. During the late 15th century, a faction of the family settled in Venetian territories, primarily Venice itself and Dalmatia.

== History ==
The Spani family possibly derived from the Shpani tribe. Their surname has acquired different interpretations. Spani may derive from the Greek word spanos (translated as "beardless, barren"). The widespread use of span-/špan- derived toponyms in specific areas of Montenegro has produced another theory which proposes that it's a name which was adopted by the native Illyrian inhabitants who lived in the karst hill regions of Montenegro and was originally used by the Greeks of the Adriatic emporia to refer to the habitat of the natives as barren ground.

However, according to a more linguistically and historically based analysis, the Spani may derive their name from the Albanian term shpan (< shtëpân) referring to a head shepherd or a cheese-making herdsman. During the medieval period, the related South Slavic term stopan denoted a rank of ruler or landowner, demonstrating a slight semantic shift. The reduction of shtëpan into shpan is demonstrated in Albanian micro-toponymy and family names. For example, in the village of Shëngjergj the micro-toponym Gurra Shpanajve (translating to "rocks/stones of the Shpani") refers to an area used as pasture by the local Shtëpani family. The surname Shpani is also found in Bushkash near Ulëz.

In medieval Venetian material, their name is usually found in the forms Span or Spani. In Albanian the name is found in the forms Spani, Shpani or Shpanaj. In Croatia and Serbia, it is rendered as Spanić and Spanović. Since the 15th century, the family promoted a claim that their name referred to their descent from the family of Theodosius the Great whose origin was from the province of Hispania. Regarding Spanić (Spaniq), it is found in 1380 also in Ragusa. A branch of this family with the surname Spanić existed on the island of Korčula in the 16th century, while another lived branch in Šibenik (Sebenico).

The Spani appear in historical records for the first time in 1330. Andrea Span de Scutaro was a wealthy trader from medieval Shkodër (Scutari) who bought land holdings in Drivasto and settled there permanently. In the 1416-17 cadaster of Shkodra, multiple members of the family appears as landowners who were feudal pronoiars of the Venetian state. The territories the family ruled varied from time to time, but Drivast seems to have been their center. This area was known in Venetian documents as monti delli Spani (mountains of the Spani). It was located the northern bank of the Drin river, south of the Drisht and north of the lands of the Dukagjini (monti delli Ducagini). In the 1380s, the Balšići had taken over Spani territory, along with much of the rest of northern Albania, all the way to Mirdita and Alessio.

After Alfonso V (r. 1416–1458) signed the Treaty of Gaeta with the Albanian leader Skanderbeg in 1451, he signed similar treaties with other chieftains from Albania: Gjergj Arianiti, Gjin Musachia, George Strez Balšić, Peter Spani, Paul Dukagjini, Thopia Musachi, Peter of Himara, Simon Zenebishi and Carlo II Tocco who were all, like Skanderbeg, recognized as vassals of the Kingdom of Naples. In the early subdivisions of Albania during the Ottoman era, the region ruled by Pjetër Spani was known in Ottoman Turkish as Petrishpani or I-shpani. Of the branches that migrated to Venetian territories, the one in Venice became extinct by the late 16th century, while the Dalmatian branch mainly found in Korčula was elevated into the ranks of local nobility. In 1455, during the Ottoman conquest of Novo Brdo, Alessio Spani (Serbian: Љеш Спановић) was the last despot's voivode in the town.

== Members ==
A branch of the family claimed descent from several imperial Byzantine families. In Gjon Muzaka's 1510 work Breve memoria de li discendenti de nostra casa Musachi, Alessio Span is mentioned as a descendant of Emperor Theodosius.

=== Marin and his descendants ===
At the beginning of the 15th century, most notable members of Spani family were Marin and his son Peter. Peter's father, Marin, is mentioned in 1409 as already dead. In 1415, Peter did not have any sons so he decided that he will be inherited by his nephew Marin, a son of his brother Brajko, and ceded several fortresses to him. When the Venetians recaptured Drivast in 1442, Peter Span lost all of his possessions.

Peter's brother, Stefan, was appointed by Venetians as the lord of village Podgora in 1406. After Podgora was given to Hoti, the Venetians compensated this loss to Stefan and gave him two small villages (Bistriola and Charochi). When Balša III died in 1421, Stefan joined Serbian Despot Stefan Lazarević who recognized his rule over three villages in Drivast.

Marin Span was commander of Skanderbeg's forces which lost fortress Baleč to Venetian forces in 1448 during Skanderbeg's war against Venice. Marin and his soldiers retreated toward Dagnum after being informed by his relative Peter Span about the large Venetian forces heading toward Baleč.

=== List of notable members ===
- Nikša Span
  - Dominika (married in November 1400).
  - Peter
- Marin Span (died before 1409), one of the most notable members of Span family at the beginning of the 15th century.
  - Peter Span
  - Stefano Span, was a 15th-century nobleman in Drivast.
  - Brajko Span (died before 1415).
    - Marin Span, nephew and successor of Peter Span, was one of Skanderbeg's military commanders.
- Alessio Span (1442–1495), diplomat of Venice.
- Pjetër Spani, Bishop of Bar from 1422–1423 to 1448.
- Peter Spani, who for a period was a member of the League of Lezhë.
- Nikola Spanić, Croatian author, magister and bishop of Korčula from 1673 to 1707.
