= Zenebishi family =

Albanian noble family

Zenebishi Zenevisi
- Noble family
- Founded: 1304
- Titles: Sebastokrator; Sanjak-bey
- Estate: Gjirokastër
- Dissolution: 1473

The Zenebishi (Albanian: Zenebishi) (fl. 1304–1460), were an Albanian noble family. They governed territories in Epirus and were centred in Gjirokastër.

Gjon Zenebishi was one of the most notable members of this family. Between 1373 and 1414, he controlled Gjirokastër and its surroundings. After the Ottomans captured the region of Epirus, some members of the family fled to Morea, while other members held high positions within the Ottoman hierarchy.

== History ==
=== Early history ===
The "Zenevias", probably the Zenebishi, are mentioned in 1304 as one of the families that were granted privileges by the Angevin Philip I, Prince of Taranto. According to Robert Elsie, the family originated from the Zagoria region between Gjirokastër and Përmet, in modern-day southern Albania.

Following the death of the Byzantine emperor in 1341, the southern Albanian tribes revolted against the empire and took control of Berat, Vlora, Spinaritsa, extending as far as Pogoniani and Libisda north of Ioannina. During this period, the Zenebishi seized control of Vagenetia, on the southern slopes of the Ceraunian Mountains. By the 1360s, the Zenebishi also controlled the cities of Bela and Dryinopolis.

In 1381 and 1384, the Catholic lords of Arta asked the Ottoman troops for protection against the invading Albanian Zenebishi clan from Gjirokastër; the Ottomans routed the raiders and restored order in Epirus.

Gjon Zenebishi is one of the most notable members of this family. Like many contemporary Balkan rulers who were under the cultural influence of the Byzantine Empire, he adopted a title from the Byzantine court hierarchy for himself, that of sevastokrator.

In 1399, during the battle of Mesopotamos, the Zenebishi defeated the army of Esau de' Buondelmonti. The Zenebishi captured the archontes of Ioannina and took Esau de' Buondelmonti hostage. This victory would mark the heyday of the Zenebishi clan, which would last until 1418. During this time, the Zenebishi clan annexed Saiata and Dryïnoupolis and made Gjirokastër the capital of their territory. During the Ottoman Interregnum (1402–13), Zenebishi lost territory to the Republic of Venice; most of the mainland territories across from the Venetian possession of Corfu were taken.

=== Ottoman period ===
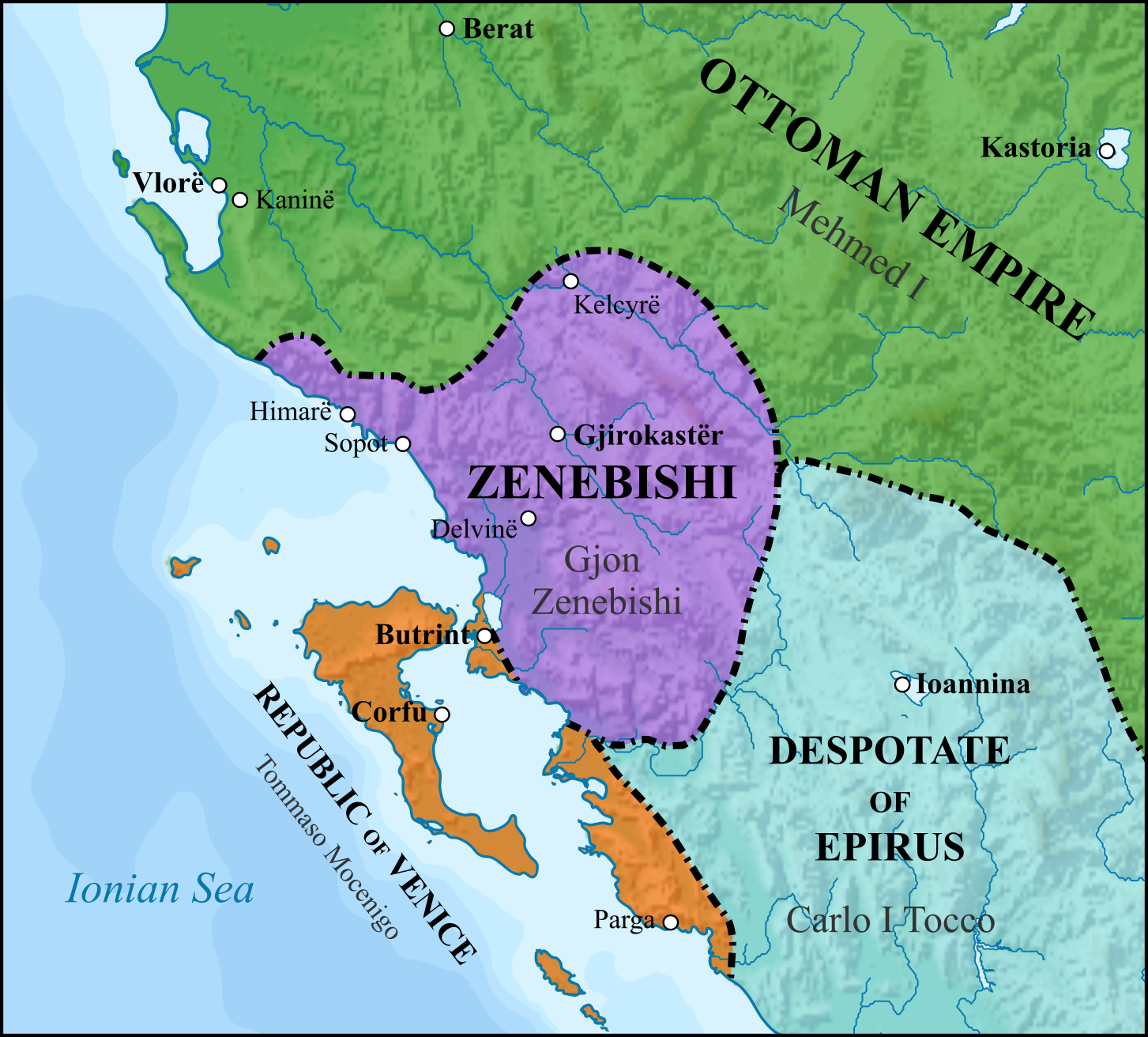
The Principality of the Zenebishi in 1418, prior to the Ottoman conquest and under the rule of Gjon Zenebishi.

Members of this family (as well as of the Arianiti and Muzaka clans) that initially resisted Ottoman expansion converted to Islam, while some of them rose to high positions within the Ottoman military and feudal hierarchy. The Ottomans besieged and took control of Gjirokaster, the capital of the Zenebishi lands, in 1418, and Gjon Zenebishi was killed in 1418 or 1419 by the Ottomans. The territory that the Zenebishi controlled before their submission to the Ottomans was registered in an Ottoman defter (tax register) of 1431 as "the lands of Zenebishi" (Turkish: Zenebisi ili). After the annexation of their territories by the Ottomans, the remaining members of the Zenebishi clan emigrated to Morea.

In 1443, Simon Zenebishi, Gjon's grandson, built the Strovili fortress with Venetian approval and support. In 1454–55, Simon Zenebishi was recognized by Alphonso V as a vassal of the Kingdom of Naples.

Gjon's son, known after his conversion to Islam as Hasan Bey, was a subaşi in Tetovo in 1455. The other son of Gjon, whose Muslim name was Hamza Zenebishi, was an Ottoman military commander who defeated the forces of the Despots of the Morea besieging Patras in 1459. In 1460, following the Ottoman conquest of the Morea, he became a sanjakbey of the Sanjak of Mezistre.

== Members ==
John Zenevisi had the following descendants:

- A1. Chiranna Zenevisi, Lady of Grabossa married Andrea III Muzaka (fl. 1419)
- A2. Maria, +after 1419; married Perotto d'Altavilla, the Baron of Corfu (+1445)
- A3. Thopia Zenevisi (d. 1435), Lord of Gjirokastër (1418–34), deposed by the Ottomans
  - B1. Simone Zenevisi, Lord of the Strovilo (1443–61), deposed by the Ottomans
    - C1. Alfonso (fl. 1456), an Ottoman political hostage who fled to Naples and became a Napolitan vassal
    - C2. Alessandro ("Lech"), Lord of Strovilo, which he then sold to Venice in 1473
    - C3. Filippo served Alessandro
- A4. Hamza Zenevisi ("Amos", fl. 1456-60), an Ottoman political hostage, he was converted into Islam and entered Ottoman service. In 1460, he became a sanjakbey of the Sanjak of Mezistre.
- A5. Hasan Zenevisi, subaşi in Tetovo in 1455.
