= Mihal Kasso =

Albanian politician

Mihal Kasso or Michael Kassos (Greek: Μιχαήλ Κάσσος) was a Greek politician, member and chairman of the Albanian Parliament, as well as representative of the Greek community in Albania.

Kasso was born of Greek origin in the village of Sheper, Zagoria, then Ottoman Empire (modern southern Albania). In 1914, he supported the pro-Greek party, that established the Autonomous Republic of Northern Epirus and struggled against annexation of the region to the newly established Albanian Principality.

With the incorporation of Northern Epirus to Albania he managed to gain influence in Albanian politics. In 1923 he became a member of the Albanian Parliament for the Gjirokaster District. He supported Ahmet Zogu, who was elected as the first President of Albania in 1925. That year and for a short period, Kasso became chairman of the Albanian Parliament. Soon later he was positioned ambassador of Albania in Athens, Greece.

Kasso, together with other representatives of the Greek minority in the Albanian Parliament, supported the educational rights of the Greeks in Albania.
