= Hamza Zenevisi =

Albanian governor in the Ottoman Empire

Hamza Zenevisi Hamza Zenebishi Sanjakbey
- Born: 14th century Zagori, Albania
- Relatives: Gjon Zenebishi (father); Lady Bua Shpata (mother)
- Military career
- Allegiance: Ottoman Empire
- Service years: 1456 - 1460

Hamza Zenevisi or Amos Sarbissa (fl.1456–60), was an Ottoman official of Albanian origin who served as the Sanjakbey of the Sanjak of Mezistre (named after its capital, Mystras).

== Life ==
He was born to the Zenebishi, a Christian Albanian noble family from the Zagori region, in modern southern Albania. He was sent as a hostage to the Ottoman court after his family submitted to the Sultan and converted to Islam.

In 1459, Hamza defeated the forces of the Despots of the Morea besieging Patras. In 1460, following the Ottoman conquest of the Morea, Hamza became the Sanjak-Bey of the Sanjak of Mezistre.
