= Lekas =

- Administrative unit
- Location within Albania
- Coordinates: 40°36′N 20°31′E
- Country: Albania
- County: Korçë
- Municipality: Korçë

Population (2011)
  - Administrative unit: 392
- Time zone: UTC+1 (CET)
  - Summer (DST): UTC+2 (CEST)
- Postal Code: 7017
- Area Code: (0)863

Lekas is a village and a former municipality in the Korçë County, southeastern Albania. At the 2015 local government reform it became a subdivision of the municipality Korçë. The population at the 2011 census was 392. The municipal unit consists of the villages Lekas, Marjan, Gjonbabas, Gurmujas, Shkozan, Xerje, Tudas, Gjergjevicë, Lavdar, Brozdvec, Mazrekë and Popinovë.

== History ==
The etymology of this village comes from name Leka, it is an Albanian male name and surname in the Balkans. The founder of the village may have had this name / surname. The origin of the Muzaka family which ruled much of south-central Albania in the late 14th century is found in the village of Lavdar. The Holy Trinity Church (1370) was founded by Chiranna Muzaka near the village.
