= Aristidh Ruçi =

Albanian politician

- Born: 11 March 1875; Sheper, Vilayet of Yannina, Ottoman Empire (modern day Albania)
- Died: 11 April 1950 (aged 75); Vlorë, Albania
- Other names: Aristidh Rruci
- Known for: Albanian Declaration of Independence; Vlora War
- Family: Ruçi

Aristidh Ruçi (11 March 1875 – 11 April 1950) was one of the signatories of Albanian Declaration of Independence in 1912. He campaigned for the spread of education in Southern Albania and was a founder of the nationalist Labëria Club.

He was born in Sheper, Zagori region near Gjirokastër, . Ruci was an active participant in the Battle of Vlora.

Late in life, Ruci served as the President of the Chamber of Commerce of Vlorë and member of the newly created Board of the Bank of Albania.

On December 28, 2009, Ruci and several other notable people from Vlorë were honoured at a ceremony at the Petro Marko theatre by the district of Vlorë.

Aristidh Ruci died in 1950 in Vlorë in a communist prison. There was neither an obituary nor a funeral service in his honor.

== Sources ==
"History of Albanian People" Albanian Academy of Science.ISBN 99927-1-623-1
