= Sheper =

- Village
- Sheper Village, winter of 2007

- Location within Albania
- Coordinates: 40°10′17″N 20°18′21″E
- Country: Albania
- County: Gjirokastër
- Municipality: Libohovë
- Administrative unit: Zagori
- Elevation: 900 m (3,000 ft)

Population
  - Total: 100 in winter 400 in summer
- Time zone: UTC+1 (CET)
  - Summer (DST): UTC+2 (CEST)
- Postal Code: 6012
- Area Code: 0883

Sheper (definite form: Sheperi) is a community in the Gjirokastër County, southern Albania. Sheperi is the largest village of the former Zagori municipality. At the 2015 local government reform it became part of the municipality Libohovë. It is mountain village located 30 km from the city of Gjirokastër, about 900 meters above sea level. Due to heavy migration, its current population is about 100 inhabitants. Sheper is inhabited by an Orthodox Albanian population.

== Demographics ==
Sheper is inhabited by an Orthodox Albanian population and some Aromanian families. The Aromanian presence in Sheper dates to the 20th century when during the communist era in Albania they settled in the area.

Mountain Rapavica, viewed from Sheper

Sunset in Sheper

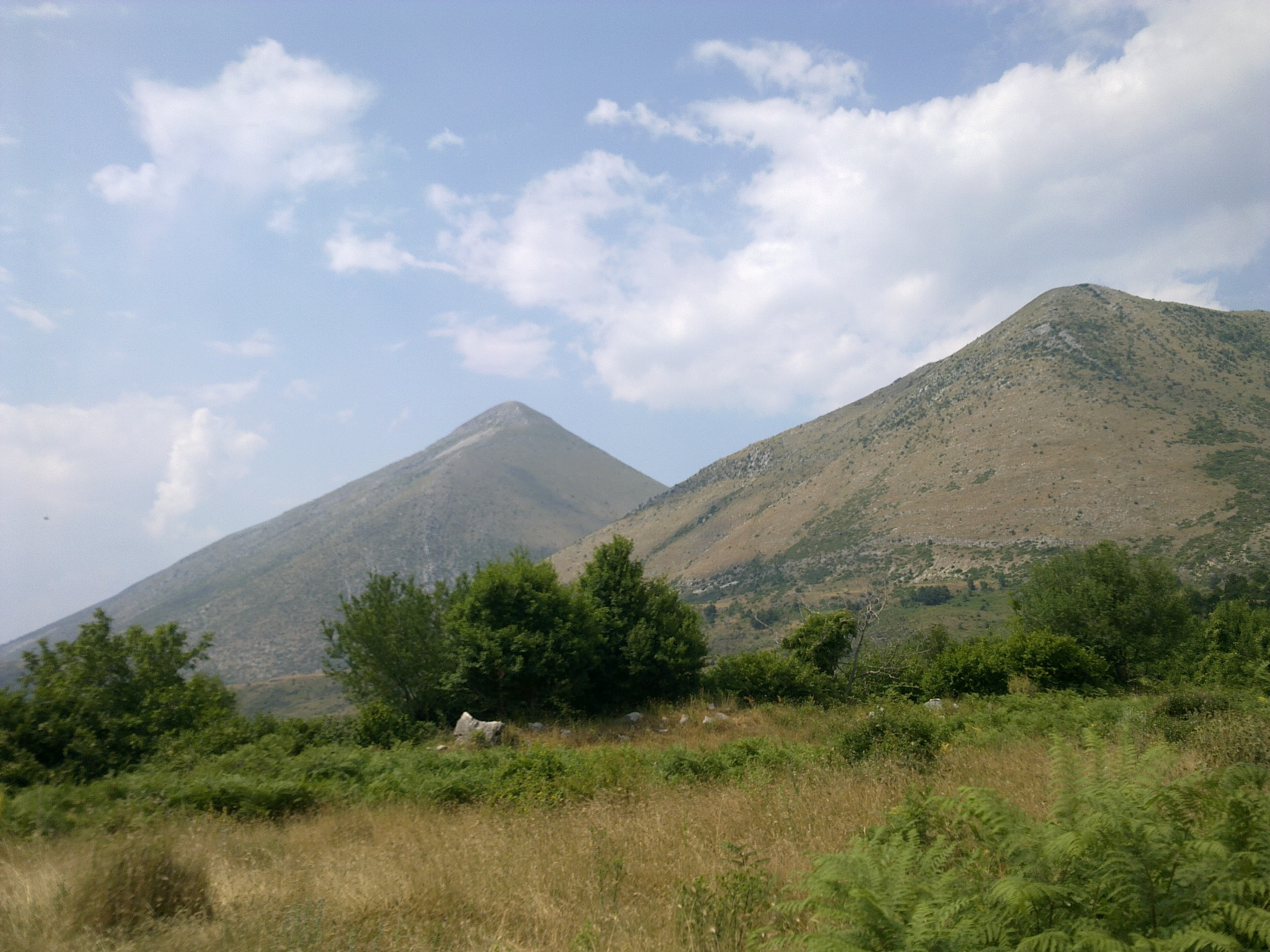
Dhëmbel, a well-known mountain in Albania

== Notable people ==
- Andon Zako Çajupi, (27 March 1866 – 11 July 1930) was an Albanian lawyer, playwright, poet and rilindas.
- Mihal Kasso, (Greek: Μιχαήλ Κάσσος) was a Greek politician, member and chairman of the Albanian Parliament, as well as representative of the Greek community in Albania.
- Aristidh Ruci, (11 March 1875 – 11 April 1950) was one of the signatories of Albanian Declaration of Independence in 1912. He campaigned for the spread of education in Southern Albania and was a founder of the nationalist Labëria club.
- Ilia Dilo Sheperi
- Pano Xhamballo
- Kiço Ngjela, politician of the Communist Albania
- Jorgo Bulo, (27 April 1939 – 26 November 2015) was an Albanian philologist, historian, and literary critic. Since 2003 up to his death (2015) he was a member of the Albanian Academy of Arts and Sciences.
- Anastas Ngjela, (3 March 1934 – 24 July 1999) was an Albanian pilot of First Class and the Colonel of Military Air Forces, of Albania Republic. He was involved in the 1957 United States Air Force incursion into Albanian airspace.
