= Nicola Muzaka =

Medieval Albanian lord of the Muzaka family

Nicola Muzaka Nikola Muzaka
- Lord of Devoll
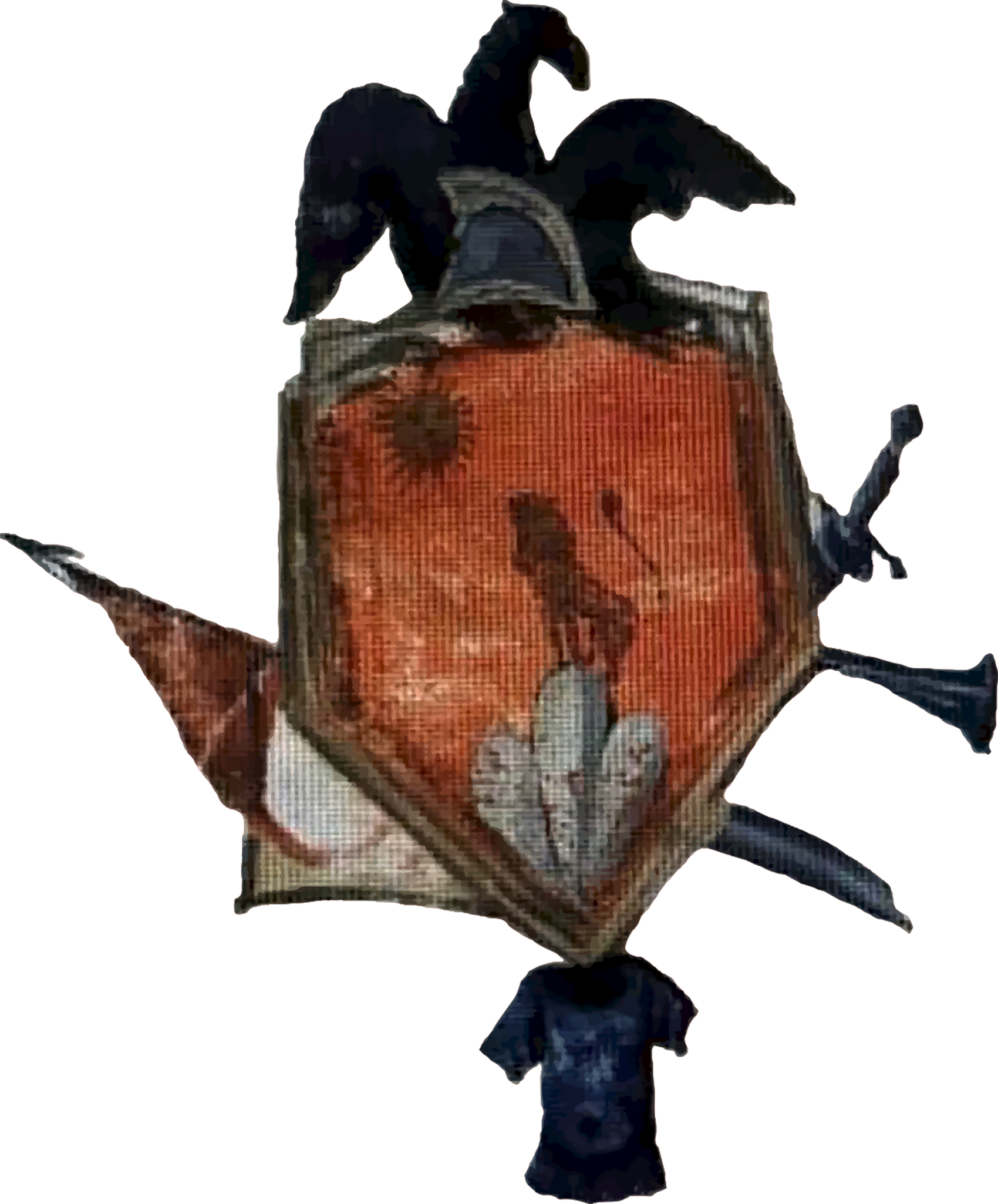
- A coat of arms attributed to Nicola Muzaka

Lord of Devoll
- Reign: 13??–????
- Born: 14th century
- Spouse: Unknown
- Issue: Pietro Muzaka; Andrea Muzaka (the Blind)
- House: Muzaka
- Father: Teodor II Muzaka
- Mother: Unknown
- Religion: Eastern Orthodox

Nicola Muzaka (Albanian: Nikola Muzaka), also known as Nicolas or Nicolao, was an Albanian nobleman and member of the Muzaka family.

== Life ==
Nicola was the son of Teodor II Muzaka, the Lord of Berat and Myzeqe. The identity of his mother remains unknown, and not much is known about his early life. He later became the Lord of Devoll.

In 1389, a tower known as Devoll Tower (or Pirgo, turris de Dievali) is mentioned in historical records, situated at the mouth of the Devoll River, with a customs office. The tower was initially tied to the conflict between Comita Muzaka of Vlorë and her nephew Nicola. At the time, following the death of Teodor II Muzaka in 1389, the rule of his domain passed to his nephew, Teodor III Muzaka, instead of his son Nicola, likely because Nicola had either died or was held captive by his aunt, Comita. When Nicola was captured during the war with Comita, his men refused to surrender the tower until his release, leading both parties to temporarily hand it over to the Venetian Bailo of Corfu. After Nicola’s release in 1390, the Venetians returned the tower to Comita, but as a Venetian fief, requiring her to send three sailors annually to the Venetian fleet in Corfu. The tower was later captured by the Ottomans in 1417. It is also found on Benincasa’s 1476 map and mentioned in a 1570 Venetian description. The tower’s existence was still known in 1714 by the Metropolitan Meletios of Janina, though it is unclear if any remains of the tower survive today.

== Family ==
The identity of Nicola's spouse remains unknown, but the couple had two children.

1. Pietro Muzaka married to Angelina
2. Andrea Muzaka (the Blind), Lord of Copes (Gopesch), married Comita Mataranga of Gora

== Family tree ==
Ancestors of Nicola Muzaka

8. Teodor I Muzaka
4. Andrea II Muzaka
9. Daughter of Paul of Ohrid
2. Teodor II Muzaka
10. Paul Mataranga
5. Euphemia Mataranga
11. Unknown
1. Nicola Muzaka
6. Unknown
3. Unknown
7. Unknown

== See also ==
- Muzaka family

== Bibliography ==
- Centre for Advanced Medieval Studies (2022). Initial. A Review of Medieval Studies. Vol. 10. Centre for Advanced Medieval Studies, Belgrade.
- Elsie, Robert (2003). Early Albania A Reader of Historical Texts, 11th-17th Centuries. Harrassowitz. ISBN 978-3-4470-4783-8.
- Hopf, Karl (1873). Chroniques greco-romanes inedites ou peu connues [Unpublished or little-known Greco-Roman chronicles] (in French). Weidmann.
- Thallóczy, Lajos (1916). Illyrisch-albanische Forschungen. Duncker & Humblot.
