= Nikola Spanić =

Albanian-Croatian prelate and nobleman

Nikola Spanić (Latinized as Nicolaus Spanich; 1633–1707) was a Roman Catholic prelate and nobleman of Korčula (an island in modern Croatia). A descendant of the Albanian Spani family of Drisht, he served as the island's bishop from 1673 to 1707. After an earthquake in 1667 he restored a church dedicated to St. Anthony near the main town of the island.
