= Nivan =

- Village
- Location within Albania
- Coordinates: 40°11′N 20°17′E
- Country: Albania
- County: Gjirokastër
- Municipality: Libohovë
- Administrative unit: Zagori
- Time zone: UTC+1 (CET)
  - Summer (DST): UTC+2 (CEST)

Nivan is a populated place in Gjirokastër County, southern Albania. At the 2015 local government reform it became part of the municipality Libohovë. Nivan is the administration center for the valley of Zagori. After 1990 Nivan and all the villages of the valley, had a drastic population decrease.

== Demographics ==
Nivan is inhabited by an Orthodox Albanian population and some Aromanian families. The Aromanian presence in Nivan dates to the 20th century when during the communist era in Albania they settled in the area.
