= Muzaka family =

Noble family from Albania

Muzaka Muzakajt
- Noble family
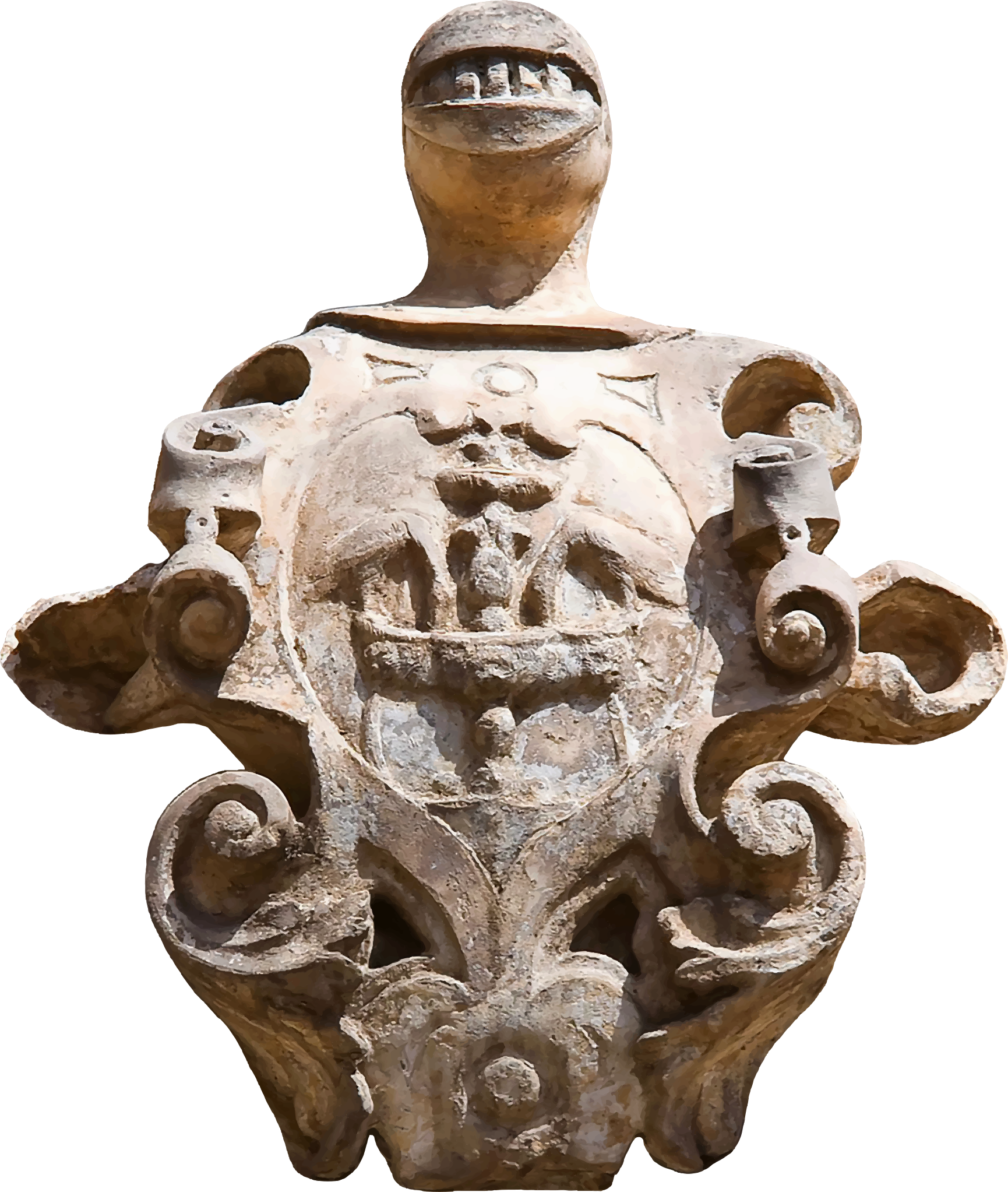
- The Muzaka coat of arms is found in bas-relief on the residence wall of Palazzo Argentina, Francavilla Fontana, mentioned by Rosario Jurlaro in his work "I Musachi despoti d'Epiro: in Puglia a salvamento".
- Country: Principality of Muzaka
- Current region: Myzeqe
- Origin: Lekas (present-day southeastern Albania)
- Founded: 13th century
- Founder: Lal Muzhaqi
- Titles: Despot; Sebastokrator; Protosebastos; Count; Sanjak-bey
- Members: Andrea I Muzaka; Andrea II Muzaka; Andrea III Muzaka; Teodor I Muzaka; Teodor II Muzaka; Teodor III Muzaka; Maria Muzaka; Gjon Muzaka; Ajdin Muzaka; Stoya Muzaka; Yakup Bey Muzaka; Gjin I Muzaka; Zanfina Muzaka; Comita Muzaka; Chiranna Muzaka; Gjin II Muzaka; Nicola Muzaka
- Connected families: Arianiti; Kastrioti; Mataranga; Zenevisi
- Cadet branches: Ahmet Kurt Pasha
- Different spellings of the name include Muzaki, Musachi, Musacchio, Musacchia, Molesachi, Muzhaku, Mouzakes, Musachiti, Musaka, Musaki, Musac, and Musacus.

The Muzaka were a noble Albanian family that ruled over the region of Myzeqe (southern Albania) in the Late Middle Ages. They are also referred to by some authors as a tribe or a clan. The earliest historical document that mentions the Muzaka family (around 1090) is written by the Byzantine historian Anna Komnene. At the end of the 13th and beginning of the 14th century members of the Muzaka family controlled a region between the rivers of Devoll and Vjosë. Some of them were loyal to the Byzantine Empire while some of them allied with Charles of Anjou who gave them (and some other members of Albanian nobility) impressive Byzantine-like titles (such as Sebastokrator) in order to subdue them more easily. In the 1340s, Stefan Dušan pressed further south into Albania, and by 1343-45 had taken central towns and territories in southern Albania, including domains of the Muzaka family. However, they would fall back under local control after his death in 1355. After the Battle of Savra in 1385 the territory of Albania came under the Ottoman Empire; they served the Ottomans until 1444 when Theodor Corona Musachi joined Skanderbeg's rebellion. When the Ottomans suppressed Skanderbeg's rebellion and captured the territory of Venetian Albania in the 15th century many members of the Muzaka family retreated to Italy. Those who stayed in Ottoman Albania lost their feudal rights, some converted to Islam and achieved high ranks in the Ottoman military and administrative hierarchy.

Notable members of the family include Andrea II Muzaka, Gjon Muzaka, Theodor Corona Musachi and Andrea I Muzaka, among others. The last notable member of Muzaka family who found refuge in Italy died in Naples in 1600.

== History ==
=== Origin ===
The Muzaka were one of the most important families of Albanian origin. The family came from the lower Opar region (Lekas). In the area of the village of Lavdar and nearby hamlets are many of the ancestral burial grounds of the family. According to ethnographic sources the earliest known member of the Muzaka noble family was Lal Muzaka. Gjon Muzaka claimed that the family received its name from the Myzeqë region, named after its population, the Molossians, through the corruption of the name Molossi (into Molosachi and finally Musachi). The coat of arms of Muzaka family was a two-headed eagle.

=== Late Middle Ages ===
The earliest mention of the Muzaka family, as a loyal commander of Alexios I Komnenos (r. 1081-1118) circa 1090, was in the work of Byzantine historian Anna Komnene. One of the first notable members of the family was Andrea I Muzaki who was, like some other members of the Albanian nobility, given impressive Byzantine-like title like sebastokrator by Charles of Anjou in order to subdue them more easily. In 1279, Gjon I Muzaka, who remained loyal to the Byzantines and resisted the Angevin conquest of Albania, was captured by the forces of Charles of Anjou, but under the pressure of local Albanian nobles he was later released. The Muzaka family continued to remain loyal to the Byzantine Empire and resisted the expansion of the Serbian Kingdom. At the end of the 13th and beginning of the 14th century members of the Muzaka family controlled a region between the rivers of Devoll and Vjosë. Andrea I ruled in the period of 1280—1319; Andrea II ruled, with some interruptions, in the period between 1319 and 1372. In 1319 three members of the Muzaka family even tried to get help from the Pope. For their loyalty to Byzantium, the head of the family Andrea II Muzaka gained the title of Despot in 1335, while other Muzakas continued to pursue careers in the Byzantine government in Constantinople.

As soon as Andrea II Muzaka had obtained the title of despot, he endorsed an anti-Byzantine revolt (1335-1341) in his domains, and also formed an alliance with the Anjou from Naples on 30 December 1336, whereas he was recognized as a vassal of Robert, Prince of Taranto. As proof of his fidelity to the Capetian House of Anjou, Andrea II Muzaka had to leave one of his sons as hostage in Durazzo.

Andrea II waged war against the Serbians, and at around 1340, he defeated the Serbian army at the Pelister mountain. After the death of Stefan Dušan in 1355 and collapse of the Serbian Empire, the Muzaka family of Berat regained control over parts of the south-eastern modern-day Albania and also over northern Greece with Kastoria that Andrew II Musachi captured from Prince Marko after the Battle of Marica in 1371.

After the death of Andrew II Muzaka in 1372 his descendants inherited control over his former domains. Theodor II Muzaka inherited control over Muzaqeya and Berat while Kastoria was inherited by his son Gjin (1337—1389). According to chronicle of Gjon Muzaka (repeated in some historical works) Comita Muzaka, one of the daughters of Andrea II Muzaka, married Balša II. Other authors confirm that Balša II married in 1372 and gained control over the territory south of Durazzo, including Valona and Kanine, as dowry. The same chronicle mentions Theodor II Muzaka as one of the participants of the Battle of Kosovo in 1389, together with Prince Marko. The Muzaka family was in conflict with Marko before his death in 1396 which is probably why Theodor Corona Musachi is commemorated in south Slavic and Serbian epic poetry as Korun Aramija, Marko's enemy.

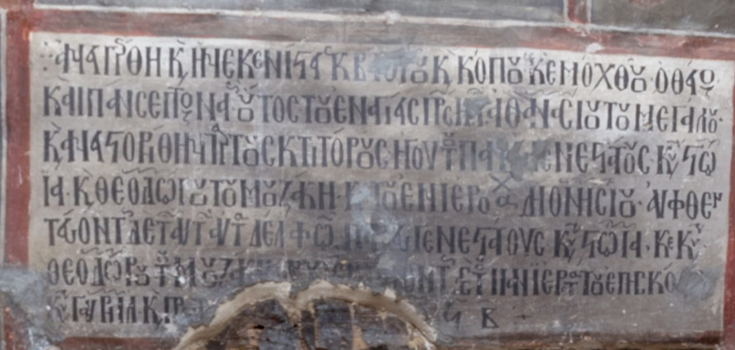
Saint Athanasius of Mouzaki church inscription mentioning the Muzaka brothers as church founders.

A Greek Orthodox church (Church of St Athanasius of Mouzaki) located in Kastoria, Greece was built in 1383–84 by Teodor II Muzaka and his brother Stoya Muzaka and dedicated to St. Athanasius. Teodor II Muzaka died in 1389 against the Ottomans in the battle of Kosovo.

=== Ottoman Empire period ===
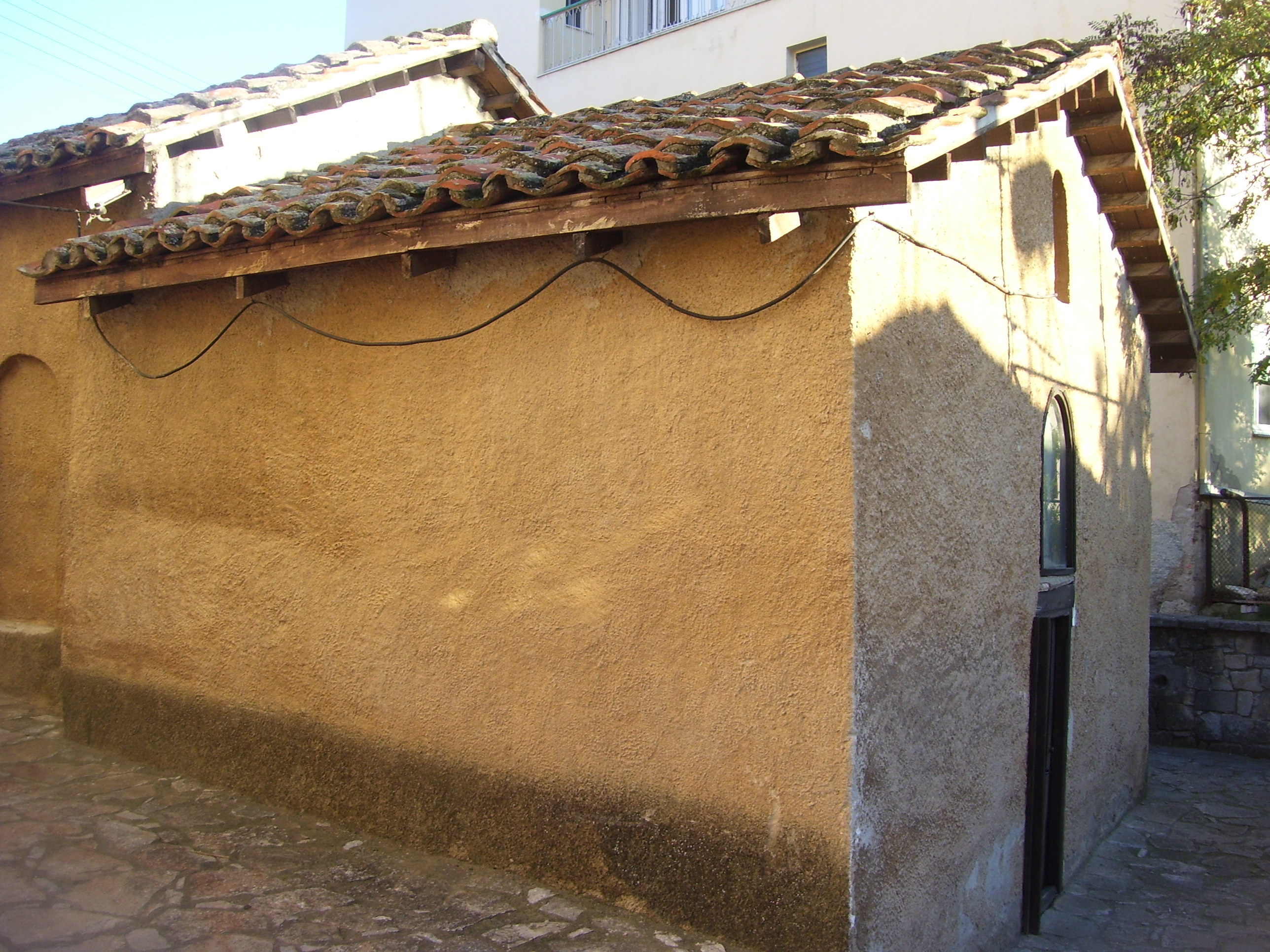
Church of St Athanasius of Mouzaki in Kastoria

After the Battle of Savra in 1385 the region of Myzeqe and most of Albanian nobility, came under control of the Ottoman Empire. The first signs of the rivalry between Venice and Ottomans in Albania appeared first in 1387 and after the death of Gjergj Thopia in 1391, when many Albanian noblemen including Andrea III Muzaka came under strong influence of Venice. To break out the influence of Venice Bayezid I launched a campaign in 1394 and restored Ottoman control over most of Albania.

In period 1415—17 Ottoman Empire annexed Vlorë and Berat and ended the rule of Muzaka family, though some of its members converted to Islam and became Ottoman officials, like Yakup Bey Muzaka son of Theodor Corona Musachi, who was sanjakbey of the Ottoman Sanjak of Albania during the Albanian Revolt of 1432–36. There are claims that Jakub's father Theodor Corona Musachi participated in the revolt while some sources emphasize that no contemporary documents support such claims. Jakub Bey Muzaka was on the position of the sanjakbey of the Sanjak of Albania until September 1442 when he was one of 16 Ottoman sanjakbeys under command of Sihàb ed-Dîn Pasa who were all killed by Christian forces commanded by Janos Hunyadi in a battle near Ialomița River. He had a son named Jusuf Celebi who is recorded as a timariot in Kalkandelen (Tetovo) in 1455.

In 1444 Theodor Corona Musachi joined Skanderbeg's rebellion. In 1455 Skanderbeg tried to recapture the city but failed. After his death many members of noble families from Albania who were before opposed to the Ottomans, like Arianiti, Zenebishi and Muzaka family, converted to Islam and achieved high ranks in the military and administrative hierarchy in Ottoman Albania. Although they were often left to rule lands they inherited from their ancestors, the new Ottoman regime obliged them to abandon part of their territories and their feudal rights.

According to some sources the last member of Muzaka family died in Naples in 1600. Still, there are other notable people recorded as members of the Muzaka family after 1600. In the middle of the 18th century a sanjakbey of the Sanjak of Avlona was Ahmet Pasha Kurt from the Muzaka family who was later appointed to the position of derbendci aga (guardian of the mountain passes) which he held until the sultan appointed Ahmet's grandson, Ali Pasha Tepelena, instead of him.

== Family tree ==
- Lal Muzaka, oldest known ancestor and father of Andrea I.
  - Andrea I Muzaka, Marshal of Albania (1280–1319)
    - Teodor I Muzaka, Protosebastus (1319–1331)
      - Andrea II Muzaka, Despot of Albania (1331–1372), married Euphemia Mataranga
        - Gjin I Muzaka, Lord, married Lady Suina Arianiti-Comneniates
          - Andrea III Muzaka, married Anna Chiranna Zenevisi
            - Gjin II Muzaka, married Kirana Zardari
              - Gjon Muzaka, married Maria Dukagjini
                - Theodore Muzaka
                - Adrian Muzaka
                - Constantine Muzaka
                - Helena Muzaka
                - Porphida Muzaka
              - Andrea Muzaka
                - Gjin Muzaka
              - Suina Muzaka, married Mosachi Comnino
                - Lord Comnino
                - Lord Arianiti
                - Lady Yela Arianiti, married to Nicholas Dukagjini, then to Sinaibego Muzaka
              - Maria Muzaka, married Dangelino Mosachi Comnenus
                - Porphida Comninata, married to Giulio de Valignano, Baron in Abruzzo
                  - Giovanni Giacomo de Valignano
                    - Antonio de Valignano
                    - Giulio Cesare de Valignano
                  - Geronimo de Valignano
                  - Hipolita Maria de Valignano, married to Lord Barone della Tolfa
                  - Giovanna de Valignano, married to Giovanni Vincenzo Brancaccio
              - Helena Muzaka, married George Blandisi Carles
                - Visava Blandisi Carles married Francesco Martino of Thoano
                - Lord Federico
                - Lord Giovanni Ferrante
                - Lord Alfonso
                - Lady Porfida, married to Giovanni Battista Caracciolo
                - Lady Giovanna, Catholic nun
                - Lady Andronica, married Giovanni Antonio Ayno
              - Comita Muzaka, married Arianites Arianiti
                - Daughter married to a son of Helichis of Montenegro
              - Condisa Muzaka married Duche, Lord of Neppe and Spatinia
              - Theodora Muzaka, married to Goissavo Balsha, then to Lekë Dukagjini
                - Nicholas Dukagjini
                  - Dukaginzade Ahmed Pasha
            - Teodor III Muzaka, Lord of Berat (1389-1450)
              - Jakup Muzaka
            - Maria Muzaka, married Gjergj Arianiti
              - Donika Kastrioti, Lady of Albania, married Gjergj Kastrioti
              - Voisava Arianiti, Lady of Zeta, married Ivan Crnojević
              - Chiranna Arianiti, married Nicholas Dukagjini
              - Helena Arianiti, married to Gjergj III Dukagjini
              - Despina Arianiti, married to Tanush IV Dukagjini
              - Angelina Arianiti, married to Stefan Branković
              - Komita Arianiti, married Gojko Balsha
              - Catherine Arianiti, married Andrew Spani then Niccolò Boccali
            - Helena Muzaka, married to Philip, Lord in Ragusa
          - Materango Muzaka
            - Gjin Molosachi Materango
              - Lord Andrea
          - Blaise Muzaka
            - Bogdan Muzaka
            - Gjin Muzaka
          - Constantine Muzaka
            - Theodore Muzaka
            - Gjon Muzaka
            - Unnamed Daughter, married Constantine Miserri
            - Theodora Muzaka, married Paul Zardari
              - Maria Zardari, married Vrana Konti
          - Bogdan Muzaka
            - Gjin Musachi Bogdan
          - Laldi Muzaka
            - Andrew Musachi, married Lady Theodora
          - Helena Muzaka, married Aidino Clopes, Lord of Vresda
          - Condisa Muzaka
          - Peter Muzaka, married to Lady Angelina
          - Andrew "the blind", married to Comita Zardari
            - Lord Mighria Muzaka
            - Lord Paul Muzaka
            - Lord Blasius Muzaka
          - Teodor II Muzaka, Lord of Berat & Myzeqe (1372–1389)
            - Nicola Muzaka
          - Stoya Muzaka, Lord of Castoria
          - Comita Muzaka, Lady of Zeta, married Balša II Balšić
            - Ruđina Balšić
          - Chiranna Muzaka, Lady of Ohër and Dibra, married Andrea Gropa
      - Mentulo Muzaka, Count of Këlcyra
    - Gjin Muzaka
    - Domenico Moncino Musachi, brother of Gjin Maria Musachi
      - Voisava Kastrioti
      - Agnes Muzaka
        - Andrea Angeli

- Ahmet Kurt Pasha Unknown Branch of Muzaka Family??
  - Hanka
    - Ali Pasha

== Armorials ==
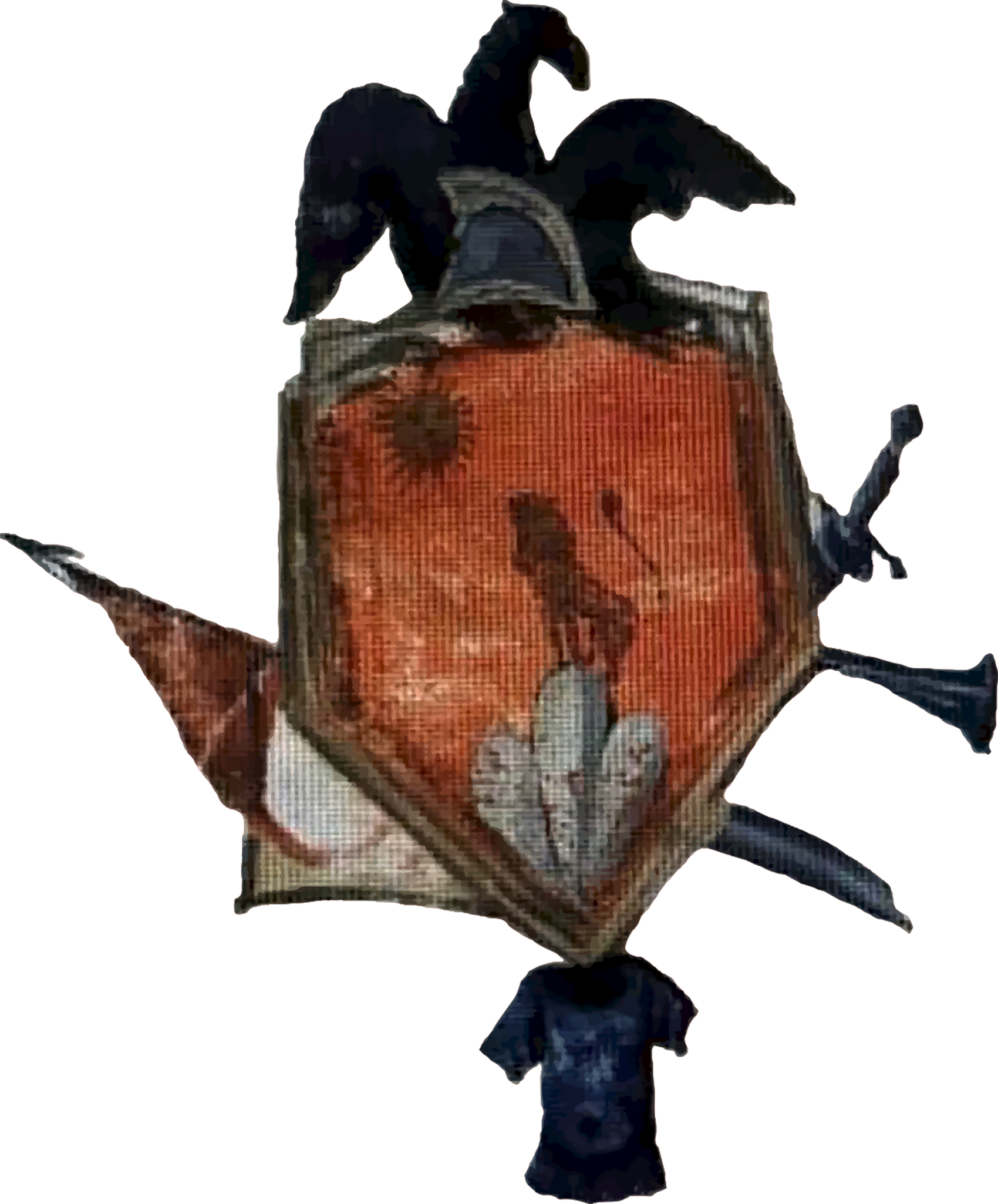
Coat of arms attributed to Nicola Muzaka in 1534

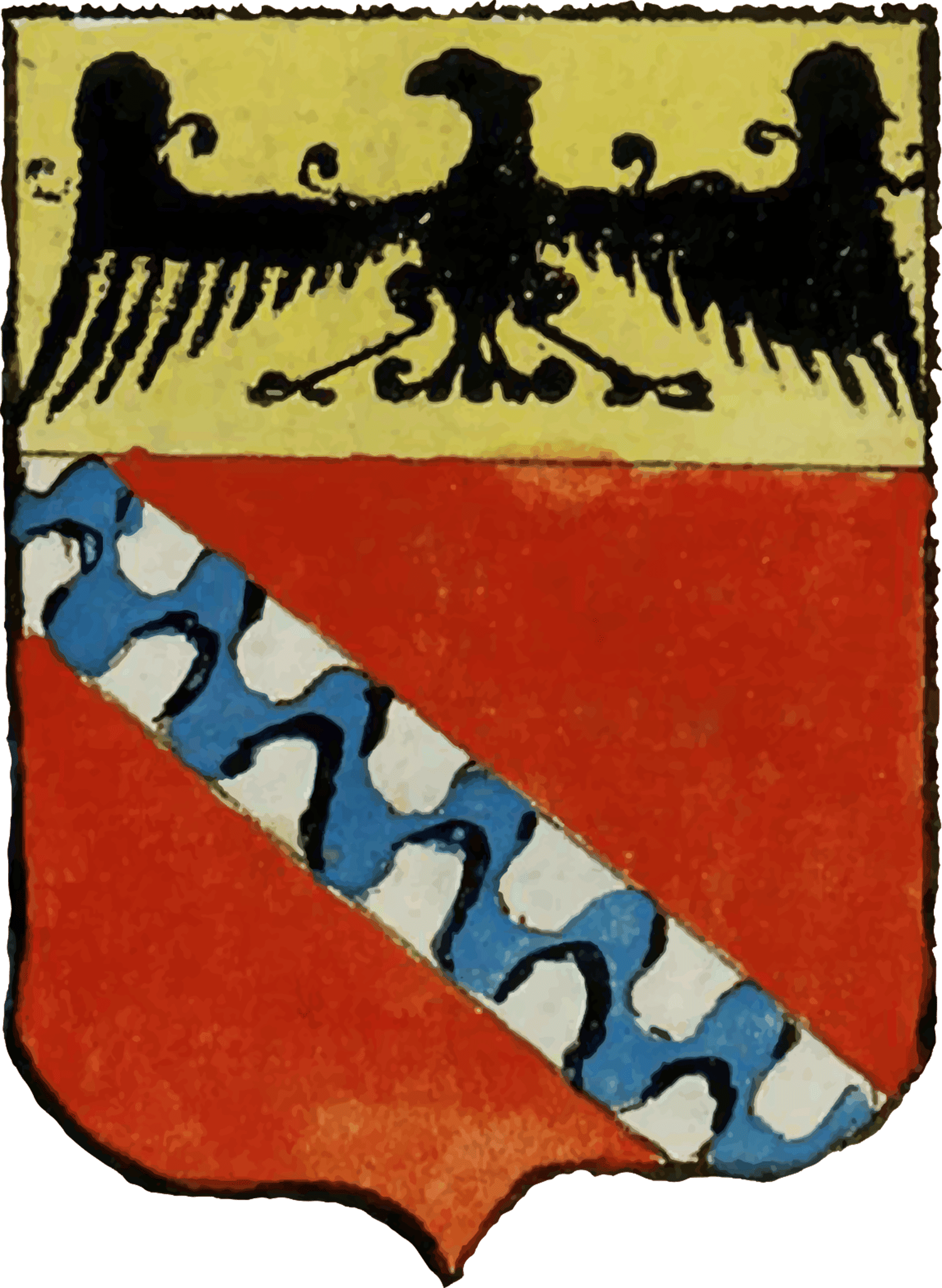
Coat of arms of the Muzaka family in 1673

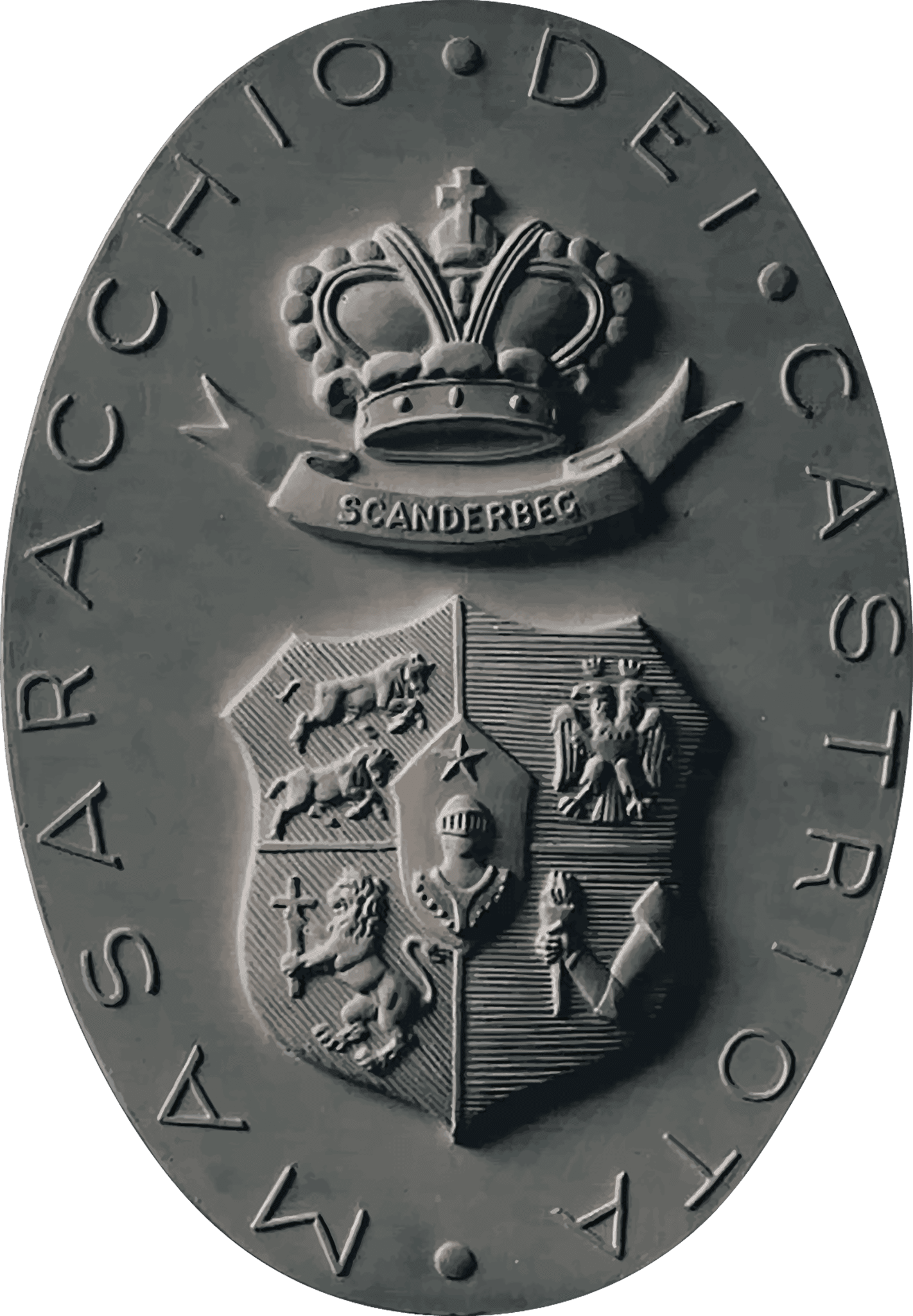
Coat of arms of the Muzaka family in the 19th-century on the Niscemi palace gate

== See also ==
- Principality of Muzaka
- Church of St Athanasius of Mouzaki
- Muzaka chronicles

== Sources ==
- Elsie, Robert (24 December 2012). A Biographical Dictionary of Albanian History. I.B.Tauris. ISBN 978-1-78076-431-3.
- Elsie, Robert (2003a). "1515 | John Musachi: Brief Chronicle on the Descendants of our Musachi Dynasty". www.albanianhistory.net. Archived from the original on 2016-03-04.
- Elsie, Robert (2003b). Early Albania A Reader of Historical Texts, 11th-17th Centuries. Harrassowitz. ISBN 978-3-4470-4783-8.
- Fine, John V. A., J.r (1994). The Late Medieval Balkans: A Critical Survey from the Late Twelfth Century to the Ottoman Conquest. University of Michigan Press. ISBN 978-0-472-08260-5.
- Duka, Ferit (2004). "Muzakajt-Lidhëz e fuqishme midis kohëve paraosmane dhe osmane [The Muzakas - a powerful link between the pre-Ottoman and Ottoman time]". Studime Historike. 1–2.
- Petta, Paolo (2000). Despoti d'Epiro e principi di Macedonia: esuli albanesi nell'Italia del Rinascimento. Argo. ISBN 8882340287.
