= Lliar =

- Village
- Location within Albania
- Coordinates: 40°12′31″N 20°13′07″E
- Country: Albania
- County: Gjirokastër
- Municipality: Libohovë
- Elevation: 650 m (2,130 ft)
- Time zone: UTC+1 (CET)
  - Summer (DST): UTC+2 (CEST)

Lliar is a small village in Gjirokastër County, southern Albania. At the 2015 local government reform it became part of the municipality of Libohovë.

An Eastern Orthodox church dedicated to Saint Nicholas is located within the village.

== Demographics ==
According to Ottoman statistics, the village had 250 inhabitants in 1895.
