= Depë Zenebishi =

- Lord of Gjirokastër
- Predecessor: Gjon Zenebishi
- Successor: Simon Zenebishi
- Born: c. 1379; Corfu
- Died: 1436
- Noble family: Zenebishi
- Issue: Simon Zenebishi
- Father: Gjon Zenebishi
- Mother: daughter of Gjin Bua Shpata

Depë Zenebishi, also Depas or Thopia Zenevisi (Albanian: Depë Zenebishi, c. 1379–1435), was an Albanian nobleman. The son of Gjon Zenebishi, he had settled in his father's estate in Corfu after the conquest of Gjirokastër by the Ottoman Empire in 1418. He was called to lead the rebels in the area of Gjirokastër during the Albanian Revolt of 1432-1436 and was defeated by Turahan Bey in early 1433. He was captured and later executed.

== Life ==
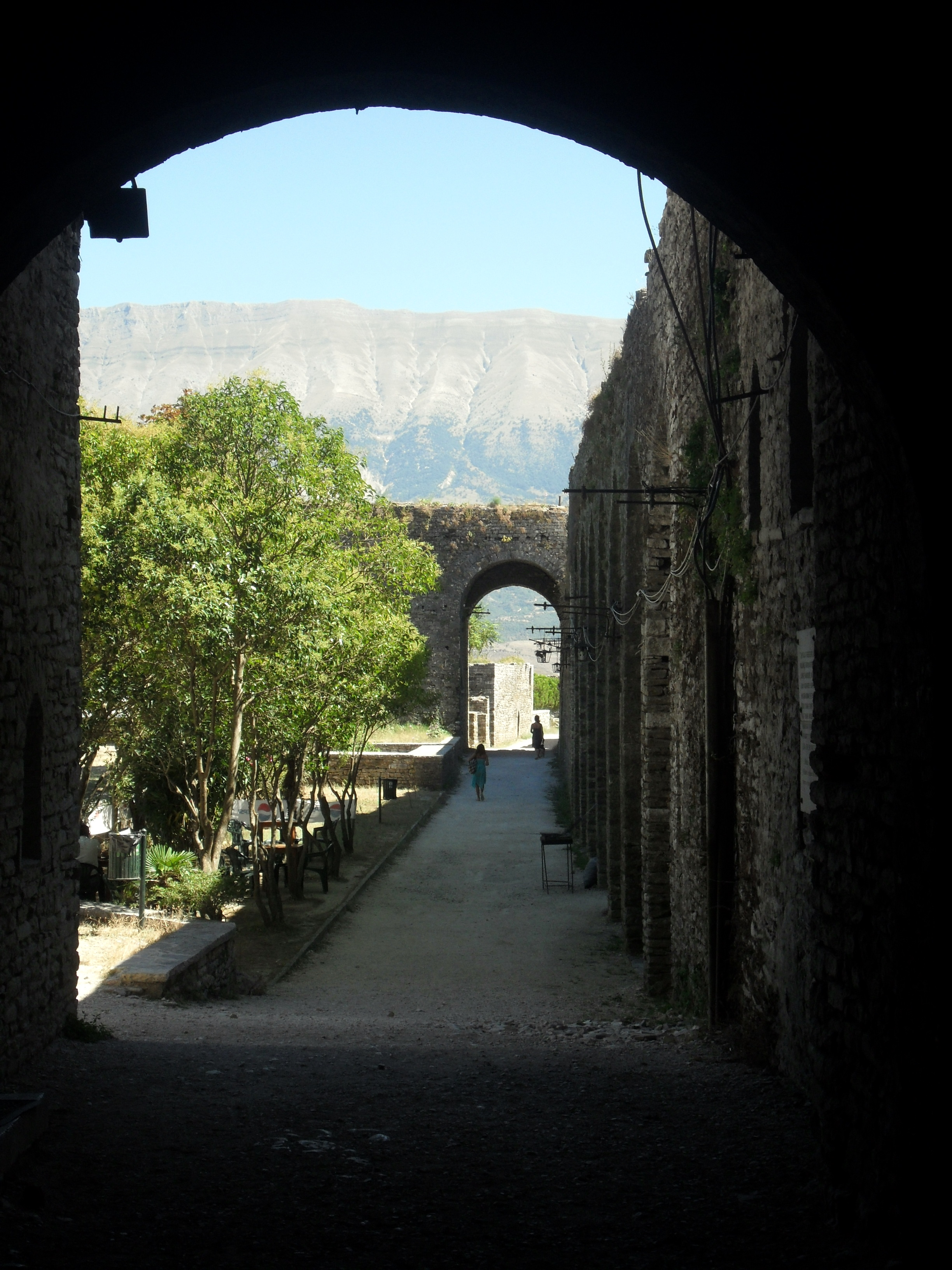
The castle of Gjirokastër was besieged by Depë Zenebishi, who was defeated by Turahan Bey

The son of Gjon Zenebishi he had settled in his father's estate in Corfu after the conquest of Gjirokastër by the Ottoman Empire in 1418. He was called to lead the rebels in the area of Gjirokastër during the Albanian Revolt of 1432-1436 and was defeated by Turahan Bey in early 1433. He was captured and later executed.

== Ancestry ==
Ancestors of Depë Zenebishi

2. Gjon Zenebishi
1. Thopia Zenebishi
6. Gjin Bua Shpata
3. Unknown name

== See also ==
- Albanian Principalities

== Annotations ==
1. Chalkokondyles calls him "Depas". In historiography, his name is mostly spelled Thopia Zenevisi.
