= Andrea III Muzaka =

14th century Albanian nobleman

Andrea Muzaka
- Lord of Deabolis; Lord of Kastoria
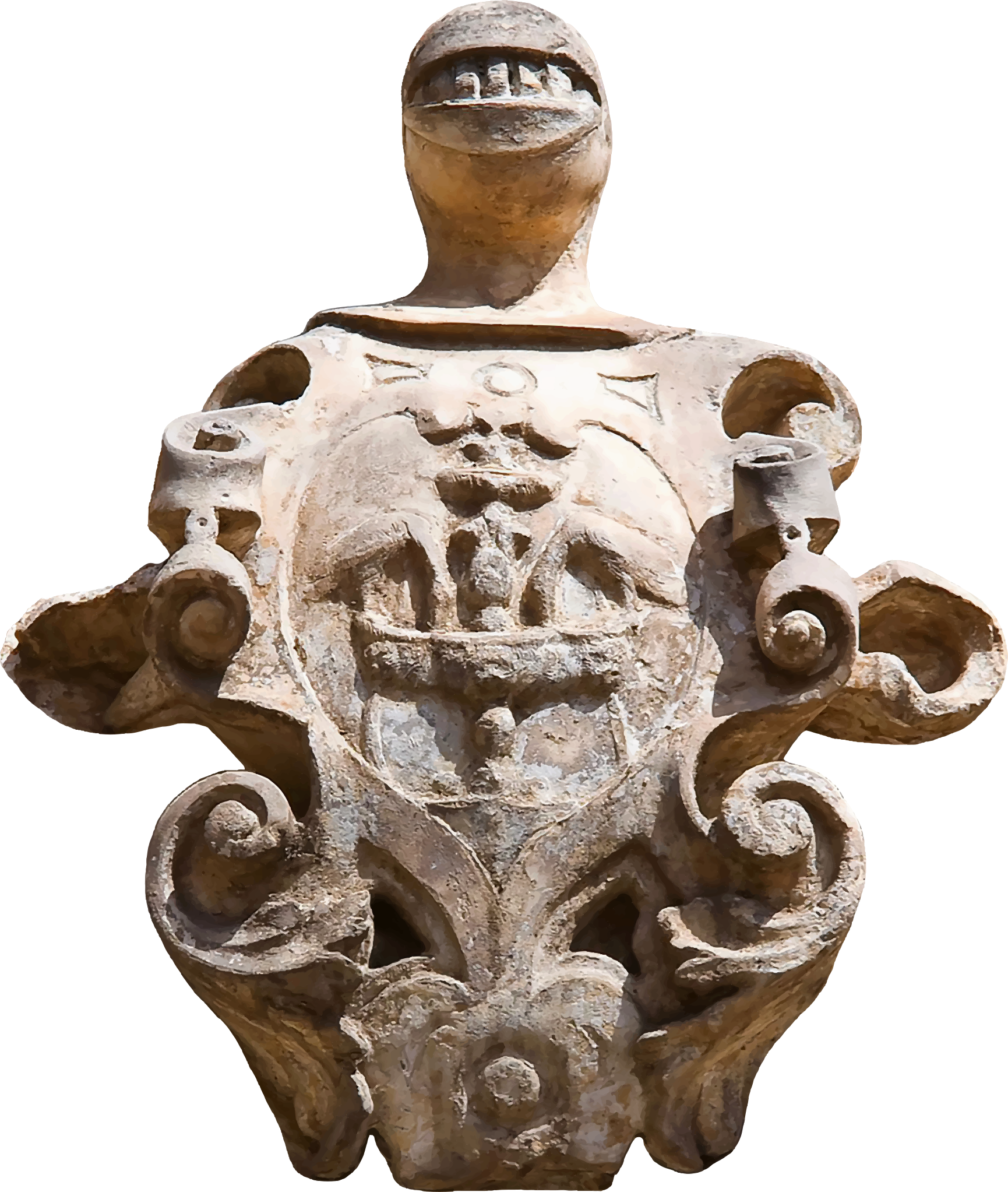
- Coat of Arms of the Muzaka family
- Born: 14th century Principality of Muzaka
- Spouse: Chiranna Zenevisi, Lady of Grabossa
- Issue: Gjin II Muzaka; Theodor III; Maria Muzaka; Helena Muzaka, Lady in Ragusa
- House: Muzaka
- Father: Gjin I Muzaka
- Mother: Zanfina Arianiti Comninata
- Religion: Eastern Orthodoxy

Andrea III Muzaka was a 14th-century Albanian nobleman, lord of Deabolis and Kastoria from the Muzaka family.

== Life and reign ==
=== Birth and ancestry ===
Born into the noble Muzaka family, Andrea's father was Gjin I Muzaka, a son of Despot Andrea II. His mother was an Albanian noblewoman, Zanfina Arianiti Comninata, daughter of Materango Arianiti from the noble Arianiti family.

=== Domains and territory ===
Andrea ruled over Deabolis, a medieval Christian Bishopric and fortress. The exact whereabouts of Deabolis have not been documented, but it is located in southern Albania, possibly identified with the modern Albanian village of Zvezdë. He also ruled over the region of Kastoria (modern-day Greece) which included the city and territories nearby it.

=== Venetian documentation ===
In Venetian documents, Andrea does not appear as a feudal Lord, but as a "valuable citizen of Durazzo". With a document dated to February 27, 1389, Andrea and other recipients received 300 ducats annually from Doge Antonio Venier for their services "to ensure that the city does not fall into the hands of the Turks" and as long as "the city is in Venetian hands." In April 1393, “the most valuable citizens of the city of Durazzo” and the "Albanese chiefs nearby" received gifts and pensions from the bailo and captain of Durazzo, Francesco Giorgio. Andreas III was also among the recipients called.

== Family ==
During his life, he married the Albanian princess Chiranna Zenevisi, Lady of Grabossa, daughter of the prince John Zenevisi. They had 4 children together:

- Gjin II Muzaka, lord of Tomorrica and Deabolis, married Chiranna Mataranga and died during the Siege of Berat, buried in the church of St. Mary in Bungë with his wife and mother.
- Theodor Corona Musachi, lord of Berat and Myzeqe, hanged by the Ottomans after they claimed the Berat castle.
- Maria Muzaka, eldest daughter, married Gjergj Arianiti, the couple had 8 daughters.
- Helena Muzaka, youngest daughter, married a nobleman called Phillip from Ragusa.
