= Simon Zenebishi =

15th–century Albanian nobleman

- Lord of the Strovilo; Lord in Albania (signore in Albania)
- Reign: 1443–1461
- Predecessor: Thopia Zenebishi
- Successor: Alessandro Zenebishi
- Died: 1461
- Noble family: Zenebishi
- Spouse: daughter of Muriq Shpata
- Issue: Alfonso Zenebishi; Alessandro Zenebishi; Filippo Zenebishi
- Father: Thopia Zenebishi
- Occupation: Albanian nobleman, Venetian nobleman, Neapolitan vassal

Simon Zenebishi (fl. 1443–61) was an Albanian nobleman and vassal of the Kingdom of Naples, who held the castle of Strovilo (Castrovilari), near Butrint, and was a member of the Zenebishi family of southern Albania. He probably dwelled in Corfu, and was later subject to the sovereignty of Alfonso of Naples.

== Life ==
He was a grandson a Gjon Zenebishi and a son of Thopia Zenebishi of the Zenebishi family. The Zenebishi had established themselves as rulers in the region of Gjirokastër, ruled by Gjon Zenebishi who in the late 14th century is a recorded as "sebastokrator". Simon appears in the historical records for the first time in a deal the Zenebishi had made with the Shpata clan of the Despotate of Arta. As part of their alliance against the Despote of Epirus, Carlo Tocco, a daughter of Muriq Shpata was married to Simon Zenebishi. This alliance held until 1413-14, when, due to unknown actions undertaken by Simon, the alliance between the Zenebishi and Shpata broke and the Zenebishi allied with the Tocco instead.

In 1443, Simon Zenebishi built the Strovili fortress with Venetian approval and support. It was located near Saiata (Sayada), and above Vagenetia, the lands of his grandfather Gjon Zenebishi. In 1454–55 he was recognized by Alphonso V as a vassal of the Kingdom of Naples.

He had a son, born and raised in Turkey, who had deserted from the Turks in 1454, who in 1455 asked the King of Naples to be baptized.

== Aftermath ==
His son, Alessandro "Lech" Zenebishi, ruled Strovilo following Simon's death until 1473, when he sold the castle to Venice.

== Ancestry ==
Ancestors of Simon Zenebishi

4. Gjon Zenebishi
2. Thopia Zenebishi
10. Gjin Bua Shpata
5. Unknown name
1. Simon Zenebishi
3. Unknown

== Name ==
In Catalan documents, his name is also spelled Simone Gimlixi and Gimbixi. An Albanian neologism of his name is Simon Zenebishi.

== Sources ==
- Makushev, Vikentij (1874). Monumenta historica slavorum meridionalium vicinorumque populorum ..., Volume 1. Typis Districtu Scolastici Varsaviensis.
- Nicol, Donald MacGillivray (2010). The Despotate of Epiros 1267–1479: A Contribution to the History of Greece in the Middle Ages. Cambridge University Press. ISBN 978-0-521-13089-9.
- Sansaridou-Hendrickx, Thekla (2017). "The Albanians in the Chronicle(s) of Ioannina: An Anthropological Approach". Acta Patristica et Byzantina. 21 (2): 287–306. doi:10.1080/10226486.2010.11879131. S2CID 163742869.
- Osswald, Brendan (2011). L'Epire du treizième au quinzième siècle : autonomie et hétérogénéité d'une région balkanique (Thesis) (in French). Université Toulouse le Mirail - Toulouse II.
