= Gjon Muzaka =

Albanian noble

- Prince of Musacchia
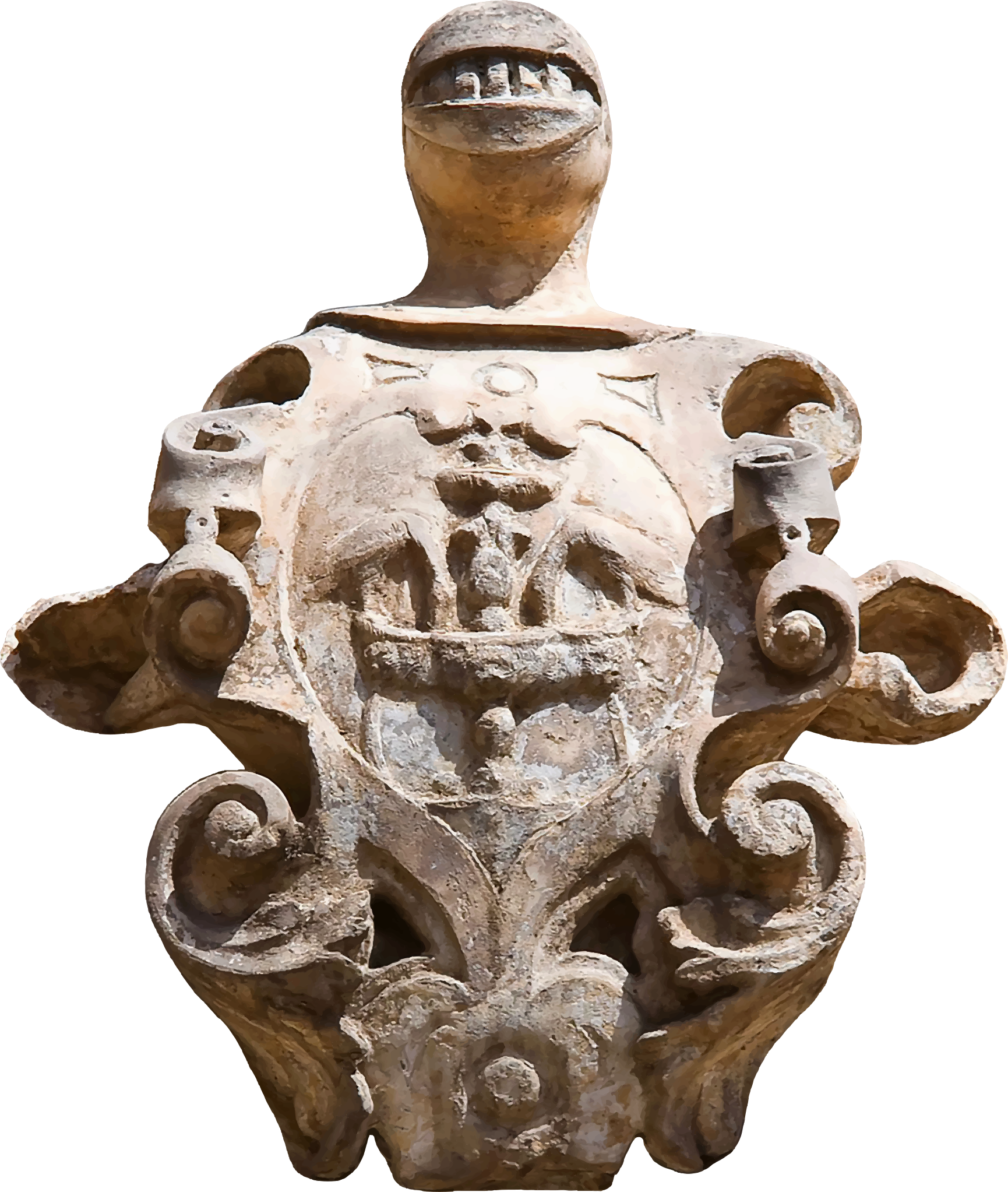
- The Muzaka's coat of arms in Francavilla Fontana
- Full name: Gjon Muzaka
- Born: c. 15th century Principality of Muzaka
- Died: 1515 or later
- Buried: Church of Francavilla, Otranto
- Noble family: Muzaka family
- Spouse: Maria Dukagjini
- Issue: Theodor Muzaka; Helena Muzaka; Andriano Muzaka; Costantino Muzaka; Porfida Muzaka
- Father: Gjin II Muzaka
- Mother: Chiranna Mataranga

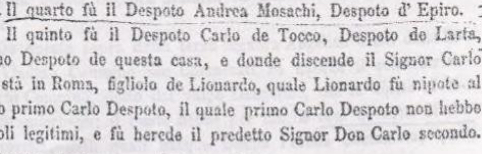
Extract from the Muzaka chronicles written by Gjon

Gjon Muzaka (fl. 1510; Italian: Giovanni Musachi di Berat) was an Albanian nobleman from the Muzaka family, that has historically ruled in the Myzeqe region, Albania. In 1510 he wrote the Muzaka chronicles (a Breve memoria de li discendenti de nostra casa Musachi. The work was published in Karl Hopf's Chroniques gréco-romaines, Paris 1873, pp. 270–340.

According to his memoirs, Gjon's father died before Ottomans captured Berat in 1417.

== The memoir of Gjon Muzaka (1515) ==
His memoir is considered to be the oldest substantial text written by an Albanian. It was originally written in Latin and his name was listed as Giovanni Musachi. In it he mentions several interesting things that were confirmed to have been accurate by Noel Malcolm. Among other things he claims that, according to family history, the name "Musachi" is derived from a corrupted form of the name "Molossachi", ancient tribesmen of Epirus known as the Molossians.

Attached to the chronicle is a document from Gjon's son, Constantine Muzaka, dated 1535. In this document, he mentions that his father “was interred in the large church of Francavilla in the region of Otranto, in a marble grave where masses are held three times a week. The grave bears an inscription that reads: Almighty Jesus, this is the grave of John Musachi, son of Gjin the Despot, Lord of Epirus and Myzeqe, who hailed from the city of Byzantium and carried the double-headed eagle as his symbol. A wreath was dedicated to him in the year of our Lord 1510.” This inscription is the reason the chronicle is conventionally dated to 1510. However, a reference to the Battle of Chaldiran in 1514 indicates that Gjon Muzaka must have died after 1515.

== Name ==
His name is mentioned in sources in several different versions, like John, Giovanni, Ivan, and Jovan.

== Ancestry ==
Ancestors of Gjon Muzaka

16. Andrea II Muzaka
8. Gjin I Muzaka
17. Euphemia Mataranga
4. Andrea III Muzaka
18. Materango Arianiti Comnenus
9. Zanfina Arianiti Comminata
2. Gjin II Muzaka
10. John Zenevisi Sebastocrator of Epirus
5. Anna Zenevisi
22. Gjin Bua Shpata
11. Lady of Bua Spata
23. Helena Preljubović; (daughter of Gregory Preljub)
1. Gjon Muzaka
12. Paul Mataranga, Sebastokrator of Ohrid
6. Son or nephew of Paul Mataranga
3. Chiranna Mataranga
7. Maria Zardari
