= John Zenevisi =

Ruler of Epirus (died 1418)

John Zenevisi Gjon Zenebishi
- Lord of Gjirokastër; Lord of Vagenetia; Lord of Paracalo; Sevastokrator

Lord of Gjirokastër
- Reign: 1386–1418
- Successor: Depë Zenebishi
- Born: 14th century Zagori, Albania
- Died: 1418
- Spouse: daughter of Gjin Bua Shpata
- Issue: Kirana Zenebishi; Maria Zenebishi; Depë Zenebishi; Hamza Zenebishi; Hasan Zenebishi
- House: Zenebishi

John Zenevisi or Gjon Zenebishi (Albanian: Gjon Zenebishi or Gjin Zenebishi; died 1418) was an Albanian magnate that held the estates in Epirus, such as Gjirokastër and Vagenetia.

== Name ==
Zenevisi can be found with different spellings in historical documents. His name in modern English is usually John Zenevisi or John Sarbissa. In Italian, his name was spelled as Giovanni Sarbissa. In Albanian, his name is mostly spelled as Gjin Zenebishi (less commonly as Zenebishti), his given name scarcely spelled Gjon, as well.

== Life ==
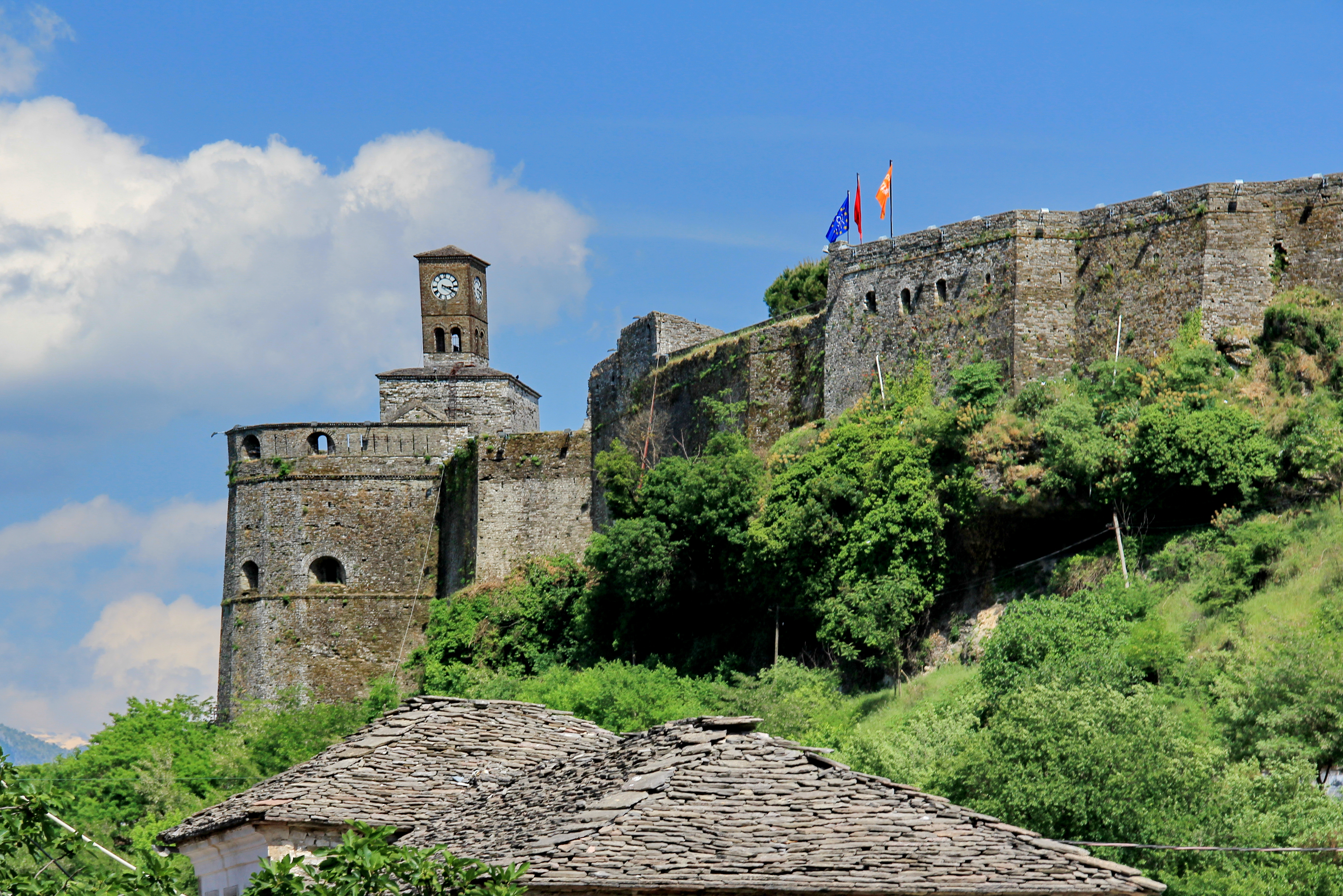
Castle of Gjirokastër was Gjon Zenebishi's capital

John was born into the Zenebishi family which was a wealthy and noble Albanian family from the Zagoria region, between Përmet and Gjirokastër. He was one of the most notable members of this family. After the Ottomans captured the region of Epirus, some members of the family fled to Morea, while other members held high positions within the Ottoman hierarchy.

In 1381 and 1384, the Catholic lords of Arta asked the Ottoman troops for protection against the invading Albanian clan of the Zenebishi; the Ottomans routed the raiders and restored order in Epirus. Zenebishi submitted to the Ottomans after their victory against Balsha II in the Battle of Savra in 1385, and gave them his son as a hostage to be sent to Edirne to the court of the sultan (this son became known as Hamza, an Ottoman official). Shortly after his submission, Zenebishi revolted and seized the fortress of Gjirokastër, encouraged no doubt by the attack on Ioannina by the Albanians of Acarnania. In 1386 he titled himself with the Byzantine title of sevastokrator.

Zenebishi was married to the daughter of Gjin Bua Shpata, Despot of Arta, and thus became the son-in-law of Shpata and the brother-in-law of the wife of Esau de' Buondelmonti Despot of Epiros. In 1399 Esau, supported by some Albanian clans, marched against his wife's brother-in-law Gjon Zenebishi of Gjirokastër. Now Esau was routed and captured, and much of his land was occupied by Zenebishi. The neighbouring magnates determined to restore the captured despotes and secured Venetian intercession in his favour. Esau returned to Ioannina in 1400, regaining the reign from Zenebishi. In 1402, Esau divorced Irene Shpata and married Jevdokija Balsha, the sister of Kostandin Balsha, a leading Ottoman official in northern Albania. After Esau's death (February 6, 1411), his wife Jevdokija tried to take control of Ioannina, but the town exiled her and appointed Esau's nephew, Carlo Tocco, as lord (he arrived on April 1, 1411).

In 1412 Muriq Shpata and Zenebishi (who was the leader of the most powerful tribe in the vicinity of Ioannina) formed an alliance against Carlo Tocco. They won an open-field battle against Tocco in 1412, but were unable to take over Ioannina. Tocco relied on support from the local Greeks. In 1414, Muriq Shpata died, and Zenebishi was defeated by the Ottomans and fled to the Venetian island of Corfu where he died in 1418.

== Aftermath ==
In the same year the Ottomans, after a prolonged siege, took Gjirokastër. Zenebishi's son, Thopia Zenebishi fled to Corfu. He landed again on the mainland and laid siege to Gjirokastër in 1434, but was killed in battle with a reinforcing Ottoman army in 1436.

== Titles ==
- Lord (signore) of Makasi (1382)
- Sevastokrator of Vagenetia and Lord of Gjirokastër and Paracalo (after 1386).

== Descendants ==
Zenebishi's descendants continued to live undisturbed in the mountains of Zagoria and eventually faded into history. In 1455, a certain Simon Zenebishi, who was the lord of Kastrovillari (Castro i Vivarit near Butrint) was active at the court of the king of Naples and Aragon on behalf of Skanderbeg in order to gain back Napolitan support for his land in Albania. In 1455, Venice, the only power to support his claim, reminded him of his pledge of allegiance to them but was not able to change his political orientation, i.e. his ties with Naples. A son of this Zenebishi was also a hostage at the court of the Sultan, this time of Sultan Mehmed the Conqueror, but fled to Naples where King Alphonso had him baptized and made him his vassal. The fate of this Alfonso Zenebishi was to be closely linked to that of Skanderbeg.

=== Family ===
Gjon married a daughter of Gjin Bua Shpata, whose name is unknown. They had the following children:

- A1. Anna ("Kyrianna"), Lady of Grabossa; married Andrea III Muzaka (fl. 1419)
- A2. Maria, +after 1419; married Perotto d'Altavilla, the Baron of Corfu (+1445)
- A3. Thopia Zenebishi ("Depas", d. 1435), Lord of Gjirokastër (1418–34), deposed by the Ottomans
  - B1. Simone Zenebishi, Lord of the Strovilo (1443–61), deposed by the Ottomans
    - C1. Alfonso (fl. 1456), an Ottoman political hostage who fled to Naples and became a Napolitan vassal
    - C2. Alessandro ("Lech"), Lord of Strovilo which he then sold to Venice in 1473
    - C3. Filippo, served Alessandro
- A4. Hamza Zenebishi ("Amos", fl. 1456–60), an Ottoman political hostage, he was converted into Islam and entered Ottoman service. In 1460 he became a sanjak-bey of the Sanjak of Mezistre.
- A5. Hasan Zenebishi, subaşi in Tetovo in 1455

== Legacy ==
The Kardhiq Castle was built by the Zenebishi family in the late 14th or early 15th century.

== See also ==
- Albanian principalities
- History of Albania

Preceded by Post created	sevastokrator of Vagenetia and lord of Argyrokastron and Paracalo; 1386–1418	Succeeded by Thopia Zenevisi (titular)
