= Skanderbeg's rebellion =

15th-century Albanian rebellion against the Ottoman Empire

Skanderbeg's rebellion Kryengritja e Skënderbeut
- Part of Albanian–Ottoman Wars
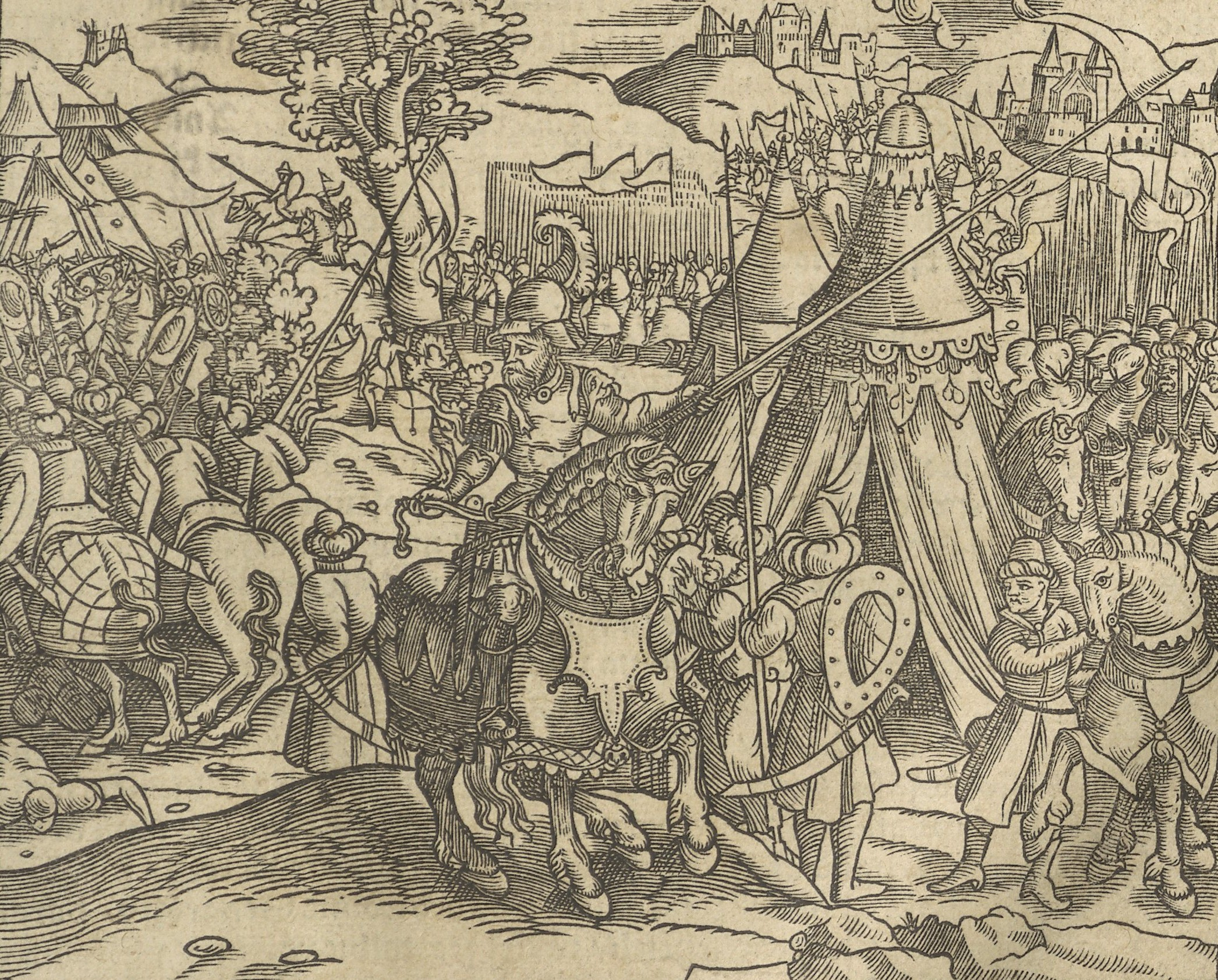
- Skanderbeg turning away from the Turcs (Kronika tho iesth Historya swiata, 1564)
| Date | November 1443 – 17 January 1468 |
| Location | Sanjaks of Albania, Dibra, and Ohrid in the Ottoman Empire; League of Lezhë; Albania Veneta; (present-day Albania and North Macedonia) |
| Result | Albanian victory; Formation of the League of Lezhë; Multiple failures by the Ottomans to suppress the rebellion |
| Territorial changes | Some Ottoman-held Albanian territories are ceded to the newly formed League of Lezhë |

Belligerents
| League of Lezhë Members: Principality of Kastrioti; Principality of Dukagjini (1444–50, 1467–68); Principality of Arianiti (1444–50, 1451–62); Lordship of Scuria; Principality of Muzaka (1444–50); Lordship of Sati and Dagnum (1444); Lordship of Spani (1444–55); Lordship of Golemi (1444–55, 1456–65); Lordship of Misia (1444–47); Lordship of Upper Zeta (1444–47); Crown of Aragon (from 1451): Kingdom of Naples; Republic of Venice (from 1463) | Ottoman Empire Republic of Venice (1447–48) |

Commanders and leaders
| Skanderbeg; Alfonso V of Aragon; Ferdinand I of Naples | Murad II; Mehmed II; Andrea Venier |

Skanderbeg's rebellion (Albanian: Kryengritja e Skënderbeut) was an almost 25-year long anti-Ottoman rebellion led by the Albanian military commander Skanderbeg in what is today Albania and North Macedonia. It was a rare successful instance of resistance by Christians during the 15th century and through his leadership led Albanians in guerrilla warfare against the Ottomans.

On 2 March 1444, the regional Albanian chieftains and nobles united against the Ottoman Empire and established the League of Lezhë under Skanderbeg. The coalition would go on to successfully fight the Ottoman forces up until the fall of Shkodër in 1479, after which it was dissolved. After Skanderbeg's death in 1468, the league would continue fighting under Lekë Dukagjini.

Skanderbeg's revolt represented a reaction by sections of local society and feudal lords against the loss of privilege and the exactions of the Ottoman government which they resented. Because of the frequent conflicts between rival families in Albania during Skanderbeg's rebellion, particularly between Skanderbeg and Lekë Dukagjini, Albanian studies scholar Robert Elsie described the period as more of an Albanian civil war. However, Skanderbeg reconciled with Lekë in 1453 and re-allied with Gjergj Arianiti in 1456.

== Background ==
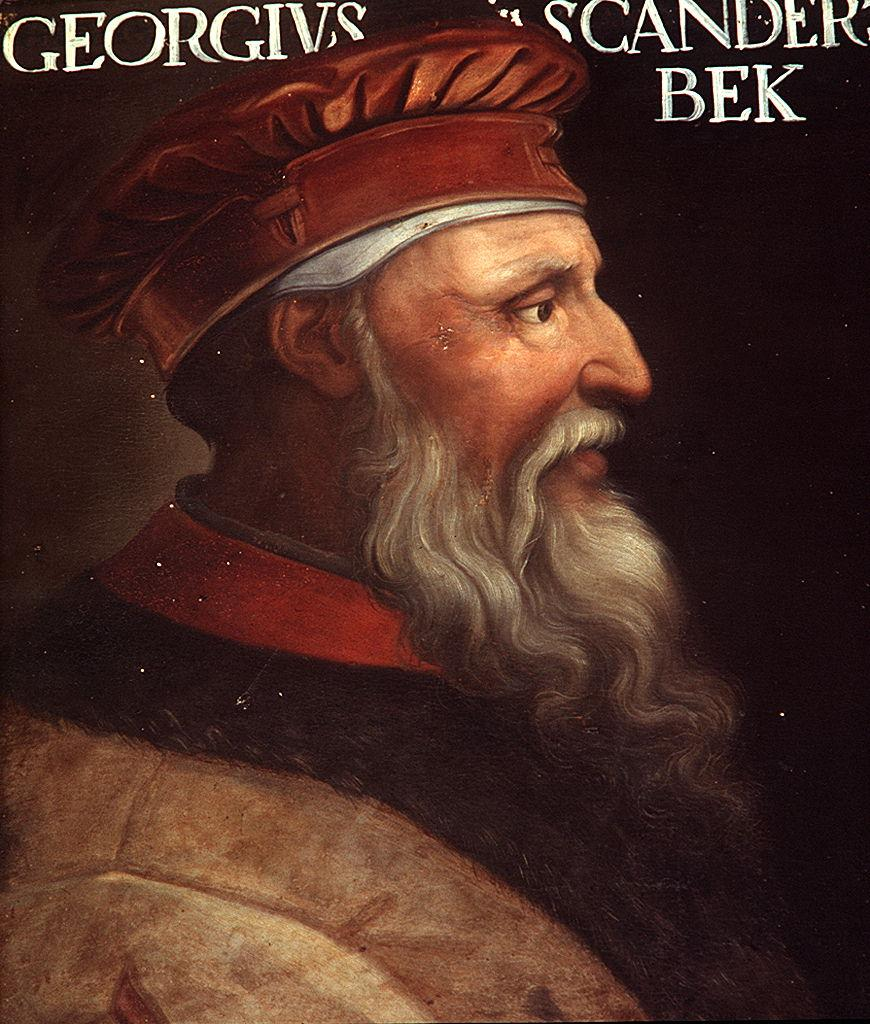
Skanderbeg by Cristofano dell'Altissimo (1552)

In Albania, the rebellion against the Ottomans had already been smouldering for years before Skanderbeg deserted the Ottoman army. The most notable earlier revolt was revolt of 1432–36 led principally by Gjergj Arianiti. Although Skanderbeg was summoned by his relatives during this rebellion, he remained loyal to the sultan and did not fight the Ottomans. After this rebellion was suppressed by the Ottomans, Arianiti again revolted against the Ottomans in the region of central Albania in August 1443.

Skanderbeg decided to leave his position of Ottoman sanjakbey and revolt against the Ottomans only after the victorious Crusade of Varna in 1443. Successes of the crusaders inspired revolt of Skanderbeg and revolt of Constantine XI Palaiologos in the Despotate of the Morea. In early November 1443, Skanderbeg deserted the forces of Sultan Murad II during the Battle of Nish, while fighting against the crusaders of John Hunyadi. Skanderbeg quit the field along with 300 other Albanians serving in the Ottoman army. He immediately led his men to Krujë, where he arrived on November 28, and by the use of a forged letter from Sultan Murad to the Governor of Krujë he became lord of the city. To reinforce his intention of gaining control of the former domains of Zeta, Skanderbeg proclaimed himself the heir of the Balsha family. After capturing some less important surrounding castles (Petrela, Prezë, Guri i Bardhë, Svetigrad, Modrič and others) and eventually gaining control over more than his father Gjon Kastrioti's domains, Skanderbeg abjured Islam and proclaimed himself the avenger of his family and country. He raised a red flag with a black double-headed eagle on it: Albania uses a similar flag as its national symbol to this day.

== Forces ==
Dorotheos, the Archbishop of Ohrid and clerics and boyars of Ohrid Archbishopric together with considerable number of Christian citizens of Ohrid were expatriated by sultan to Istanbul in 1466 because of their anti-Ottoman activities during Skanderbeg's rebellion. Skanderbeg's rebellion was also supported by Greeks in the Morea. According to Fan Noli, the most reliable counselor of Skanderbeg was Vladan Jurica. Himara also supported the war and supplied men to fight under Skanderbeg.

=== League of Lezhë (1444–1450) ===
On 2 March 1444 the regional Albanian and Zetan chieftains united against the Ottoman Empire. This alliance (League of Lezhë) was forged in the Venetian held Lezhë. The main members of the league were the Arianiti, Balšić, Dukagjini, Muzaka, Spani, Thopia and Crnojevići. All earlier and many modern historians accepted Marin Barleti's news about this meeting in Lezhë (without giving it equal weight), although no contemporary Venetian document mentions it. Barleti referred to the meeting as the generalis concilium or universum concilium [general or whole council]; the term "League of Lezhë" was coined by subsequent historians.

== Early battles ==
Kenneth Meyer Setton claims that majority of accounts on Skanderbeg's activities in the period 1443–1444 "owe far more to fancy than to fact." Soon after Skanderbeg captured Krujë using the forged letter to take control from Zabel Pasha, his rebels managed to capture many Ottoman fortresses including strategically very important Svetigrad (Kodžadžik) taken with support of Moisi Arianit Golemi and 3,000 rebels from Debar. According to some sources, Skanderbeg impaled captured Ottoman officials who refused to be baptized into Christianity.

The first battle of Skanderbeg's rebels against the Ottomans was fought on 10 October 1445, on the mountain Mokra. According to Setton, after Skanderbeg was allegedly victorious in the Battle of Torvioll, the Hungarians are said to have sung praises about him and urged Skanderbeg to join the alliance of Hungary, the Papacy and Burgundy against the Ottomans. In the spring of 1446, using help of Ragusan diplomats, Skanderbeg requested support from the Pope and Kingdom of Hungary for his struggle against the Ottomans.

=== War against Venice ===
Marin Span was commander of Skanderbeg's forces which lost the fortress Baleč to Venetian forces in 1448 during Skanderbeg's war against Venice. Marin and his soldiers retreated toward Dagnum after being informed by his relative Peter Span about the large Venetian forces heading toward Baleč.

== Treaty of Gaeta ==
On 26 March 1451 a political treaty was stipulated in Gaeta between Alfonso V for the Kingdom of Naples and Stefan, Bishop of Krujë, and Nikollë de Berguçi, ambassadors of Skanderbeg. In the treaty Skanderbeg would recognize himself a vassal of the Kingdom of Naples, and in return he would have the Kingdom's protection from the Ottoman Empire. After Alfonso signed this treaty with Skanderbeg, he signed similar treaties with other chieftains from Albania: Gjergj Arianiti, Gjin Muzaka, Gjergj Balsha, Peter Spani, Paul Dukagjini, Thopia Muzaka, Peter of Himara, Simon Zenebishi and Carlo II Tocco.

To follow the treaty of Gaeta, Naples sent a detachment of 100 Napolitan soldiers commanded by Bernard Vaquer to the castle of Kruje in the end of May 1451. Vaquer was appointed as special commissioner and took over Kruje on behalf of the Kingdom of Naples and put its garrison under his command.

== Aftermath ==
Gjergj Balsha was perceived by Venice as Skanderbeg's successor, whilst Lekë Dukagjini became the leader of the League. After Skanderbeg's death Ivan and his brother Gojko Balšić, together with Leke, Progon and Nicholas Dukagjini, continued to fight for Venice.

In 1595, Francesco Patrizi recommended an invasion of the Balkans with an Italian force of 30,000 men, he wrote: "If we landed in Albania, all the Albanians would come to our side; they are a courageous people, so much feared by the Ottomans, both because of the ancient memory of their glory under Skanderbeg, and because of the very fierce hatred they feel at present.".

== See also ==
- Timeline of Skanderbeg

== Sources ==
- Schmitt, Oliver Jens (2012), Die Albaner: eine Geschichte zwischen Orient und Okzident (in German), C.H.Beck, ISBN 978-3-406-63031-6
- Setton, Kenneth Meyer (1978), The Papacy and the Levant, 1204–1571, DIANE Publishing, ISBN 978-0-87169-127-9
- Božić, Ivan (1979). Nemirno pomorje XV veka (in Serbian). Belgrade: Srpska književna zadruga. OCLC 5845972.
- Fine, John V. A. (1994) [1987]. The Late Medieval Balkans: A Critical Survey from the Late Twelfth Century to the Ottoman Conquest. Ann Arbor, Michigan: University of Michigan Press. ISBN 978-0-472-10079-8.
- Srpska Akademija Nauka i Umetnosti (1980). Glas (Volumes 319–323) (in Serbian). Belgrade: Serbian Academy of Science and Arts.
- Schmitt, Oliver Jens (2001). Das venezianische Albanien (1392–1479). Munich: R. Oldenbourg Verlag. ISBN 3-486-56569-9.
