= Theodor Corona Musachi =

Albanian nobleman (died 1450)

Theodor Corona Musachi Teodor Koronë Muzaka
- Prince of Muzaka; Lord of Berat
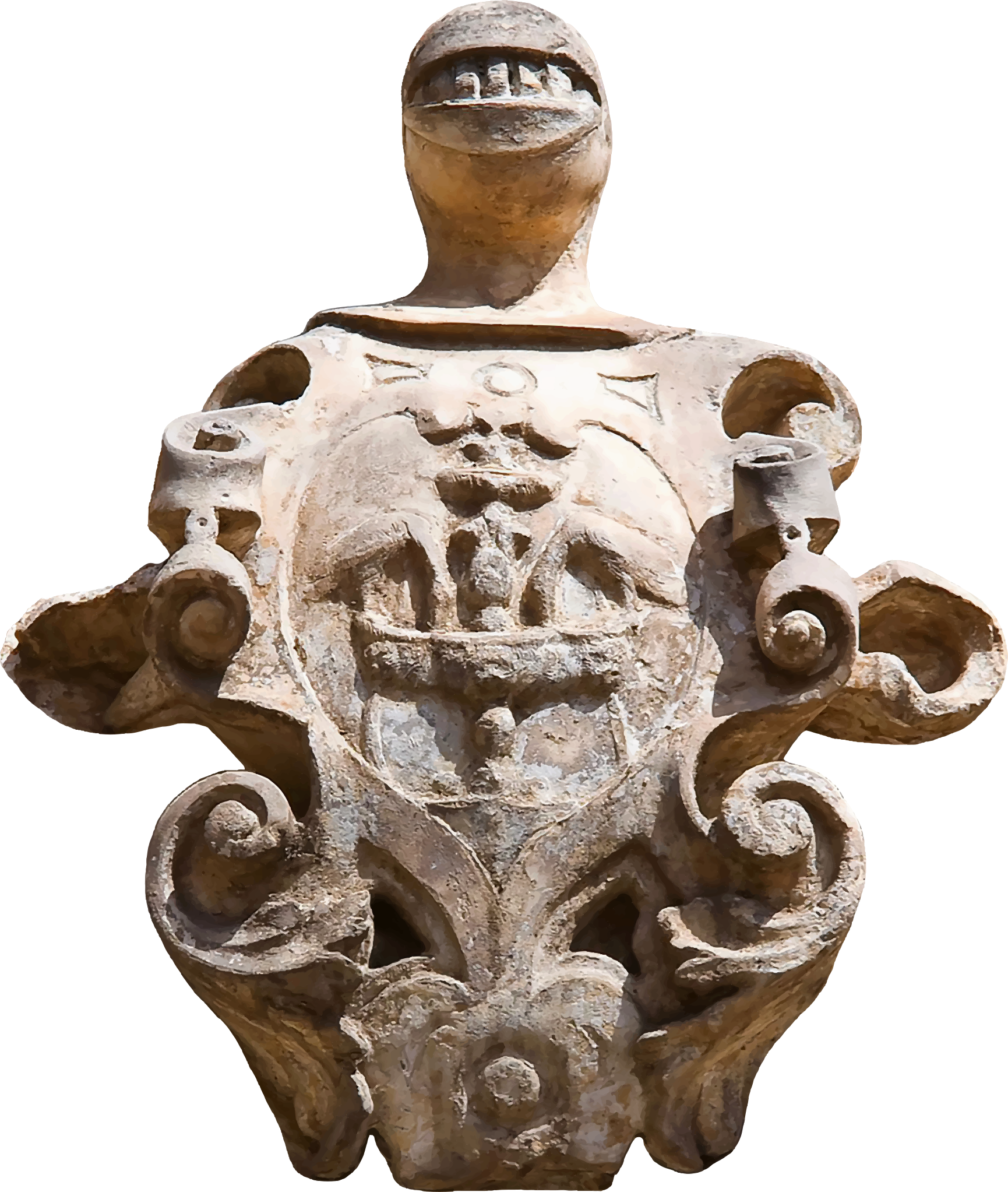
- Coat of Arms of the Muzaka family

Lord of Berat and Myzeqe
- Reign: after 1396 – 1417
- Predecessor: Teodor II Muzaka
- Successor: Post Abolished.
- Born: before 1393; Principality of Muzaka (modern day Southern Albania)
- Died: 1450; Berat, Ottoman Empire, Surroundings of Berat, part of League of Lezhë (modern Albania)
- Issue: Jacob Muzaka
- House: Muzaka
- Father: Andrea III Muzaka
- Mother: Chiranna Zenevisi, Lady of Grabossa
- Religion: Eastern Orthodox

Theodor Corona Musachi (Albanian: Teodor Koronë Muzaka) or Teodor III Korona Muzaka, was an Albanian nobleman who led the 1437–38 revolt against the Ottomans and was one of the founders of the League of Lezhë in 1444.

== Life ==
=== Ancestry and Inheritance ===
Theodor Corona Musachi was а prominent member of the Muzaka family. They were rulers of the Principality of Muzaka, whose domains extended from Myzeqe till Kastoria, (modern-day Greece).

According to John Muzaka's memoir, Theodor was the youngest son of Andrea III and his wife Chiranna Zenevisi, Lady of Grabossa. The couple had another son Ginno II, who would become Lord John's father, as well as two daughters, Maria and Helena. Through his sister Maria, Theodor III was an in-law of Skanderbeg, who married his niece, Andronika Arianiti.

In the chronicle, John Muzaka explained that Theodor inherited control over Berat from his father. However, the exact period when the Muzaka family began to control the city remains unknown. Byzantine Eastern Roman sources state that the Muzaka family had been in control of Beratian regions since 1270, sometimes under the Byzantine rule and at other times as de jure independent lords. Unlike other ethnicities of the Eastern Roman Empire, Albanian Princes had the right of total autonomy and self-governance in their lands, with the promise to join the Roman emperor in foreign wars. Such autonomy is confirmed in the diary of Theodor Muzaka I, in which the Muzakas are mentioned as having been rulers of Epirus for centuries. Although, a clear distinction between the historical land of Epirus and parts of Southern Albania is not stated.

=== Military activities ===
One of the biggest political threats to the Muzaka was Prince Marko, with whom they had constant conflicts with. Nonetheless, they managed to defeat Marko and take large shares of south and southwestern Macedonia from him.

Before 1396, (the year of Marko's death), Theodor Corona Musachi was likely a young man who participated in the conflict over Kastoria. As a result he is commemorated in Serbian and south Slavic epic poetry as Korun Aramija, Marko's enemy.

At the end of 1411, Niketa Thopia suffered a heavy defeat from the forces of Theodor III. This event was recorded in a Venetian source composed on 29 February 1412. He himself was held prisoner and with the intervention of the Ragusan Republic was released in 1413, but only after conceding some territories around the Shkumbin river to the Muzaka family.

=== Ottoman invasion ===
The Ottoman Empire first invaded the principality in 1415, and in 1417 captured the city of Vlorë. Berat was captured that same year following a surprise attack.

==== Revolt against the Ottomans ====
In 1437–38, while sanjakbey of the Sanjak of Albania was Theodor's son Yakup Bey, Theodor Korona Muzaka revolted in the region of Berat. This revolt was, like previous Albanian Revolt of 1431–36, suppressed by the Ottomans. Even though in the Albanian Revolt of 1432–36 Gjergj Arianiti was victorious over Ottomans and secured the independence and enlargement of his principality by including today's Bitola. There are claims that Muzaka's 1437—38 revolt is not supported by contemporary sources. Jakub Bey was recorded to be on the position of the sanjakbey of the Sanjak of Albania in 1442.

=== Death ===
Berat belonged to Theodore. In 1449, he became seriously ill and was dying. He sent for Skanderbeg to take over the castle in the name of the League of Lezhë. Skanderbeg sent an Albanian detachment led by Pal Kuka, to claim the castle. In the meantime a force of Ottoman soldiers came from their garrison in Gjirokastër, quietly scaled the poorly guarded walls of Berat at night, slaughtered the Albanian garrison of about 500 soldiers, hanged the dying Theodore Muzaka, and claimed the castle, while the captain Pal Kuka was later ransomed.

== League of Lezhë ==
The League of Lezhë was founded by:

- Lekë Zaharia (lord of Sati and Dagnum) and his vassals Pal Dukagjin and Nicholas Dukagjini
- Peter Spani (lord of the mountains behind Drivast)
- Lekë Dushmani (lord of Pult)
- George Strez Balšić with Ivan Strez Balšić and Gojko Balšić
- Andrea Thopia and his nephew Tanush
- Gjergj Arianiti
- Theodor Corona Musachi
- Stefan Crnojević (lord of Upper Zeta) and his sons

== Notes ==
=== Footnotes ===
1. Oliver Schmitt does not mention Musachi as one of the founders of the league.

== See also ==
- Muzaka family
- Principality of Muzaka
- Church of St Athanasius of Mouzaki

Theodor Corona Musachi Muzaka family
Regnal titles
Preceded by Andrew Molosachi	Lord of Berat ? – 1417	Succeeded by Post abolished
