= Pal Dukagjini =

- Full name: Pal Dukagjini
- Born: 1411
- Died: 1458 (aged 46–47)
- Noble family: Dukagjini
- Spouse: daughter of Komnen Arianiti
- Father: Tanush Dukagjini
- Occupation: ?–1444: Vassal of Lekë Zaharia; 1444–1454: Vassal of Venice; 1454–1457: Vassal of the Kingdom of Naples; 1457: Joined Ottoman forces

Pal Dukagjini (Italian: Paolo Ducagini, 1411–1458) was an Albanian nobleman, a member of the Dukagjini family. He and his kinsman Nicholas Dukagjini were initially subjects of Lekë Zaharia, a Venetian vassal who had possessions around Shkoder. Nicholas murdered Lekë, and the Dukagjini continued to rule over their villages under Venetian vassalage. Pal and Nicholas were part of the League of Lezhë, a military alliance that sought the liberation of Albania from the Ottoman Empire, founded by the powerful Skanderbeg. In 1454, the Dukagjini accepted the vassalage of Alfonso V of Aragon, as other chieftains had done three years earlier. Pal later abandoned Skanderbeg's army and deserted to the Ottomans.

== Life ==
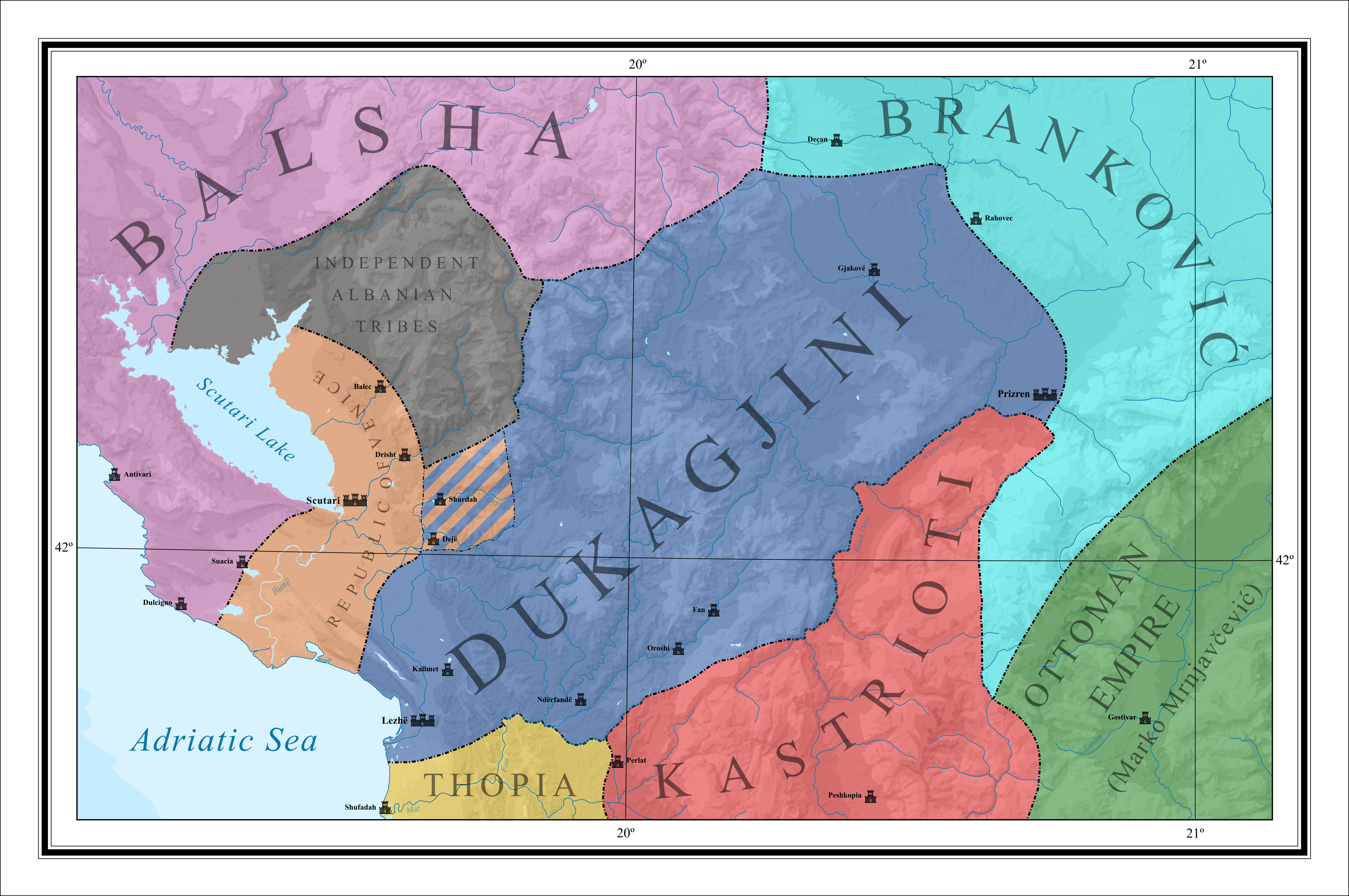
Dukagjini family in the late 14th century

He was one of the founding members of the League of Lezhë, an anti-Ottoman military alliance of some Christian members of the Albanian nobility forged in Lezhë on 2 March 1444 by:

- Lekë Zaharia (lord of Sati and Dagnum), and his vassals Pal and Nicholas Dukagjini
- Peter Spani (lord of the mountains behind Drivasto)
- Lekë Dushmani (lord of Pult)
- George Strez, John and Gojko Balšić (lords of Misia)
- Andrea Thopia with his nephew Tanush
- George Araniti
- Theodor Corona Musachi
- Stefan Crnojević (lord of Upper Zeta) with his three sons Ivan, Andrija and Božidar

Pal Dukagjin and Nikola Dukagjin were vassals of Lekë Zaharia until Nikola Dukagjini killed him in 1444. Venice accepted their control over the properties they ruled when they were vassals of Lekë Zaharia (which included villages Buba, Salita, Gurichuchi, Baschina) because they agreed to be Venetian vassals after Zaharia's death.

Alfonso V of Aragon first signed the Treaty of Gaeta with Skanderbeg in 1451 and then he signed similar treaties with Pal Dukagjini and other chieftains from Albania including: George Araniti, Ghin Musachi, George Strez Balšić, Peter Spani, Thopia Musachi, Peter of Himara, Simon Zenebishi and Carlo Toco.

Pal was in Venice between November 1451 and February 1452, when the Venetian Senate accepted his request not to serve Venice in Ulcinj anymore but in Alessio because it was closer to his estates. The Senate ordered the lord of Ulcinj to pay for the previous services of Pal Dukagjin, and ordered the lord of Alessio to accept Pal's future services.

On 21 October 1454, Alphonso V of Naples informed Skanderbeg that Pal Dukagjini had sent his envoys and declared his loyalty and vassalage to the Kingdom of Naples, which assigned 300 ducats of annual provisions to him.

Together with many other Albanian noblemen (like Moisi Arianit Golemi, Nicholas Dukagjini and Hamza Kastrioti), he abandoned Skanderbeg's forces and deserted to the Ottomans. In 1457 Pope Callixtus III criticized the bishop of Krujë for the unjustified excommunication of Pal Dukagjini and his subjects.

Pal Dukagjini left four sons: Nicholas Dukagjini, Lekë, Progon and Gjergj, of whom Nicholas and Lekë were politically notable. Pal was married to a daughter of Komnen Arianiti.
