= Stresio =

Stresio is the Italian spelling of a second name used by the Balšić noble family in 15th-century Albania. It may refer to:

- George Strez Balšić (Giorgio Stresio), lord of Misia
- Ivan Strez Balšić (Joanne Stresio), lord of Misia
