= Andrea II Thopia =

15th century Albanian nobleman

- Lord of Scuria
- Died: after 1479
- Noble family: Thopia
- Issue: Karl Muzakë Thopia; Komnin Thopia
- Father: Tanush Thopia

Andrea II Thopia (Albanian: Andrea Topia; died before March 1445) was a 15th century Albanian nobleman whose domains included the territory of Scuria (between Durazzo and what would later become modern day Tirana). He was a member of the Thopia family and one of the founders of the League of Lezhë.

== Family ==
Andrea Thopia was a great-nephew of Karl Thopia. He had two sons, Karl Muzaka and Komnin (possibly Serafina Thopia).

== 1432—1436 rebellion ==
After the Battle of Savra in 1385, the region of Albania came under strong Ottoman influence and gradually most of its territory was annexed to the Ottoman Empire within a separate administrative unit: the Sanjak of Albania. Andrea revolted against Ottoman rule in 1432 and defeated a small Ottoman military unit in the mountains of Central Albania. His victory inspired other chieftains in Albania, especially Gjergj Arianiti, to rebel against the Ottomans.

== League of Lezhë ==
Together with his nephew (Tanush Thopia), Andrea participated in the founding of the League of Lezhë (1444 military alliance led by Skanderbeg). The members included Lekë Zaharia, Pjetër Spani, Lekë Dushmani, Andrea Thopia, Gjergj Arianiti, Theodor Muzaka, Stefan Crnojević, and their subjects. His title was Lord of Scuria (near Durazzo).

According to Gjon Muzaka, Andrea Thopia was among the members of this league who outlived the fall of Scutari into Ottoman hands in 1479.

== In literature ==
Girolamo de Rada, an Italian writer of Italo-Albanian literature, dedicated his 1839 work Albanian Historical Songs of Serafina Thopia, Wife of Prince Nicholas Dukagjini (Italian: Canti storici albanesi di Serafina Thopia, moglie del principe Nicola Ducagino) to unfulfilled love of Serafina Thopia and Bosdare Stresa (an Albanian Romeo and Juliet). Serafina, who was daughter of Andrea Thopia in this song, sacrificed her love to Bosdare and married Nicholas Dukagjini to help uniting southern and northern Albania to fight against the Ottomans.

== Annotations ==
1. League of Lezhe:
  - Lekë Zaharia (lord of Sati and Dagnum) and his vassals Pal Dukagjin and Nicholas Dukagjini
  - Peter Spani (lord of the mountains behind Drivasto)
  - Lekë Dushmani (lord of Pult)
  - George, Ivan and Gojko Balšić
  - Andrea Thopia with his nephew Tanush Thopia
  - Gjergj Arianiti
  - Theodor Corona Musachi
  - Stefan Crnojević with his sons Ivan, Andrija and Božidar

== See also ==
- Thopia family
- Principality of Albania (medieval)
- Saint Gjon Vladimir's Church

== Sources ==
- Elsie, Robert (2005), Albanian literature: a short history, London: I.B. Tauris in association with the Centre for Albanian Studies, ISBN 1845110315
- Noli, Fan Stilian (1947), George Castrioti Scanderbeg (1405-1468), International Universities Press, OCLC 732882
- Schmitt, Oliver Jens (2001), Das venezianische Albanien (1392-1479) (in German), München: R. Oldenbourg Verlag GmbH München, ISBN 3-486-56569--9
