= Lekë Dushmani =

Albanian nobleman

- Lord of Zadrima and Pult

Prince of Dushmani
- Died: Before 1458
- Noble family: Dushmani family
- Issue: Jerina (Irene) Dushmani

Lekë Dushmani was an Albanian nobleman and one of the founding members of League of Lezhë, a military alliance formed, on 2 March 1444, by Albanian chieftains and nobles united against the Ottoman Empire.

== Life ==
A member of the Dushmani family he ruled over the region of Zadrima, in modern Shkodër District. In Venetian documents he is also mentioned along with his relative Damian as lord of Pult in 1446.

Leka joined the League of Lezhë, an alliance formed by their maternal uncle Skanderbeg, after meeting in the St. Nicholas Church in Lezhë on March 2, 1444. The other members included Lekë Zaharia, Peter Spani, Andrea Thopia, Gjergj Arianiti, Theodor Korona Muzaka, Stefan Crnojević, George Strez Balsha, and their subjects. Skanderbeg was elected as the alliance's leader, and the commander-in-chief of its armed forces numbering a total of 8,000 warriors.

His descendants include Antonio, Sofoklis and Viktor Dousmanis.

== Annotations ==
1. Name: Other versions of his name include: Lek Dushmani, Lek Dushman, Leccas Dusmanus, Leccha Dusmanus, etc. His given name is a diminutive of Alexander, and may also be spelled "Luka".
2. League of Lezhe:
  - Lekë Zaharia (lord of Sati and Dagnum) and his vassals Pal Dukagjin and Nicholas Dukagjini
  - Peter Spani (lord of the mountains behind Drivasto)
  - Lekë Dushmani (lord of Zadrima and Pult)
  - George Strez Balšić and his brothers Ivan and Gojko (lords of Misia)
  - Stefan Crnojević with his sons Ivan, Andrija and Božidar (lords of Zeta)
  - Andrea Thopia with nis nephew Tanush Thopia
  - Gjergj Arianiti
  - Theodor Corona Musachi

== Sources ==
- Noli, Fan Stilian (1947), George Castrioti Scanderbeg (1405-1468), International Universities Press, OCLC 732882
- Božić, Ivan (1979), Nemirno pomorje XV veka (in Serbian), Beograd: Srpska književna zadruga, OCLC 5845972
- Schmitt, Oliver Jens (2001), Das venezianische Albanien (1392–1479) (in German), München: R. Oldenbourg Verlag GmbH München, ISBN 3-486-56569-9
