= Gojko Balšić =

Member of the Balšić noble family

Gojko Balšić Gojko Balsha
- Lord of Misia
- Died: after 1468
- Noble family: Balsha
- Spouse: Comita Arianiti
- Issue: Maria Balsha, Countess of Muro
- Occupation: Member of the League of Lezhë (1444–1468)

Gojko Balšić or Gojko Balsha (Serbian: Гојко Балшић; Albanian: Gojko Balsha; fl. 1444) and his brothers George Strez and John were the lords of Misia, a coastal area from the White Drin towards the Adriatic. The brothers were members of the house of Balšić, which earlier held the Lordship of Zeta. They participated in founding the League of Lezhë, an alliance led by their maternal uncle Gjergj Kastrioti Skanderbeg. Gojko supported Skanderbeg until the latter's death in 1468, and then continued to fight against the Ottomans within Venetian forces.

== Family ==
There are two views of his genealogy. According to Gjon Muzaka and Karl Hopf, Ivan (John, Gjon) and Gojko Strez Balšić were in fact children of Vlajka Kastrioti and Stefan Strez who was a son of Đurađ Balšić, an illegitimate child of Đurađ I Balšić. According to Fan Noli, Gojko had two brothers (George Strez and Ivan), both children of Jela Kastrioti and Pavle Balšić. Both views confirm that Gojko was Skanderbeg's nephew.

Gojko married Comita Arianiti, a daughter of Gjergj Arianiti. According to Gjon Muzaka, they had two sons and one daughter, Maria. The sons died in Hungary. Muzaka stated that Maria married the Count of Muro and had two daughters, Beatrice and Isabel. Beatrice, married Prince Ferdinand Orsini, Duke of Gravina while Isabel, married Lord Louis of Gesualdo, Count of Conza.

== Biography ==
Gojko and his brothers were lords of Misia, a coastal area from the White Drin towards the Adriatic. The three Balšić brothers joined the League of Lezhë, an alliance formed by their maternal uncle Skanderbeg, after meeting in the St. Nicholas Church in Lezhë on March 2, 1444. The members included Lekë Zaharia, Peter Spani, Lekë Dushmani, Andrea Thopia, Gjergj Arianiti, Theodor Musachi, Stefan Crnojević, and their subjects. Skanderbeg was elected its leader, and commander in chief of its armed forces numbering a total of 8,000 warriors.

Gojko's brother George cancelled his support to Skanderbeg after a while, while Gojko and John supported Skanderbeg until his death in 1468. After Skanderbeg's death Gojko and John Balšić together with Leke, Progon and Nicholas Dukagjini, continued to fight for Venice.

== Annotations ==
1. League of Lezhe:
  - Lekë Zaharia (lord of Sati and Dagnum) and his vassals Pal Dukagjin and Nicholas Dukagjini
  - Peter Spani (lord of the mountains behind Drivasto)
  - Lekë Dushmani (lord of Pult)
  - George, Ivan and Gojko Balšić
  - Andrea Thopia with nis nephew Tanush Thopia
  - Gjergj Arianiti
  - Theodor Corona Musachi
  - Stefan Crnojević with his sons Ivan, Andrija and Božidar
  Name: His name is written in Latin documents as Coico Balsa.
