= Nicholas Dukagjini =

Albanian noble

- Hereditary: Draga, Gjergj
- Died: before 1454
- Noble family: Dukagjini family

Nicholas Dukagjini (Italian: Nicolas Ducagin, Albanian: Nikollë Dukagjini) was a 15th-century Albanian nobleman and member of the Dukagjini family.

== Biography ==
Nicholas Dukagjini was the son of Gjergj Dukagjini, who died before 1409 when Nicholas was mentioned for the first time as the landlord of two villages near Lezhë (Alessio) and the commander of a 140 men troop (40 cavalry and 100 infantry). Nicholas' name appears in documents of 1409.

He participated in Albanian Revolt of 1432–1436 led by Gjergj Arianiti, during which he succeeded in regaining the territory held by his family before the Ottoman conquest of Albania. He even managed to capture Dagnum which he promptly granted to Venice. Unwilling to provoke the Ottomans, Venice returned Dagnum to Ottoman control in 1435.

=== League of Lezhë ===
Nicholas Dukagjini was one of the founding members of League of Lezhë, a military alliance of some members of the Albanian nobility forged in Lezhë on 2 March 1444 by:

- Lekë Zaharia (lord of Sati and Dagnum), and his vassals Pal and Nicholas Dukagjini
- Pjetër Shpani (lord of the mountains behind Drivasto)
- Lekë Dushmani (lord of Pult)
- Gjergj Strez, Gjon and Gojko Balsha (lords of Misia)
- Andrea Thopia together with nis nephew Tanush
- Gjergj Arianiti
- Theodor Corona Musachi
- Stefan Crnojević (lord of Upper Zeta) with his three sons Ivan, Andrija and Božidar

When Nicholas Dukagjini killed Lekë Zaharia in 1444 the Venetian Republic took over control of Zaharia's former realm. Nicholas Dukagjini continued his struggle against the new authorities and managed to capture Sati and several villages without a fight. He later concluded peace with Venice and in 1446 he is recorded in Venetian archives as the "former enemy" (tunc hostis noster).

On October 4, 1448, the Albanian–Venetian War was ended when Skanderbeg and Nicholas Dukagjini signed a peace treaty with the Republic of Venice, represented by the governor of Shkodra, Paulo Loredano and a special envoy, Andrea Venerio. According to this agreement, signed at Skanderbeg's military camp, adjacent to Alessio, Venice would keep its possessions in Albania, including Dagnum under certain conditions: The Republic had to pay to Skanderbeg a yearly sum of 1,400 ducats, some members of the League would benefit certain trade privileges etc.

Together with many other Albanian noblemen (such as Moisi Arianit Golemi, Pal Dukagjini and Hamza Kastrioti) he abandoned Skanderbeg's forces and deserted to the Ottomans. Ottomans allowed him to govern 25 villages in Debar and 7 villages in Fandi. Nicholas died before 1454.

== Descendants ==
Nicholas Dukagjini had two sons, Draga and Gjergj, none of whom could lead a political life, because they were both killed in 1462. Draga Dukagjini was killed from ambush by Lekë Dukagjini who first captured many Draga's villages. Only a descendant remained, Gjergj's infant son, Nicholas, who eventually entered the service of the Venetian Republic.

== In literature ==
Girolamo de Rada, an Italian writer of Italo-Albanian literature, dedicated his 1839 work Albanian Historical Songs of Serafina Thopia, Wife of Prince Nicholas Dukagjini (Italian: Canti storici albanesi di Serafina Thopia, moglie del principe Nicola Ducagino) to unfulfilled love of Serafina Thopia and Bosdare Stresa (an Albanian Romeo and Juliet). Serafina sacrificed her love to Bosdare and married Nicholas Dukagjini to help uniting southern and northern Albania to fight against the Ottomans.

== Sources ==
- Noli, Fan Stilian (1947), George Castrioti Scanderbeg (1405–1468), International Universities Press, OCLC 732882
- Bešić, Zarij M. (1970), Istorija Crne Gore / 2. Crna gora u doba oblasnih gospodara (in Serbian), Titograd: Redakcija za istoriju Crne Gore, OCLC 175122851
- Božić, Ivan (1979), Nemirno pomorje XV veka (in Serbian), Beograd: Srpska književna zadruga, OCLC 5845972
- Akademia e Shkencave e Shqipërisë, Instituti i Historisë; K. Prifti, Xh. Gjeçovi, M. Korkuti, G. Shpuza, S. Anamali, K. Biçoku, F. Duka, S. Islami, S. Naçi, F. Prendi, S. Pulaha, P. Xhufi (2002), Historia e Popullit Shqiptar (Vëllimi I) (in Albanian), Tirana, Albania: Toena, ISBN 99927-1-622-3
- Fine, John Van Antwerp (1994), The Late Medieval Balkans: A Critical Survey from the Late Twelfth Century to the Ottoman Conquest, University of Michigan Press, ISBN 978-0472082605
- Schmitt, Oliver Jens (2001), Das venezianische Albanien (1392–1479) (in German), München: R. Oldenbourg Verlag GmbH München, ISBN 3-486-56569-9
- Elsie, Robert (2005), Albanian literature: a short history, London: I.B. Tauris in association with the Centre for Albanian Studies, ISBN 1845110315
