= League of Lezhë =

1444–1479 Albanian aristocratic alliance

- Lidhja e Lezhës
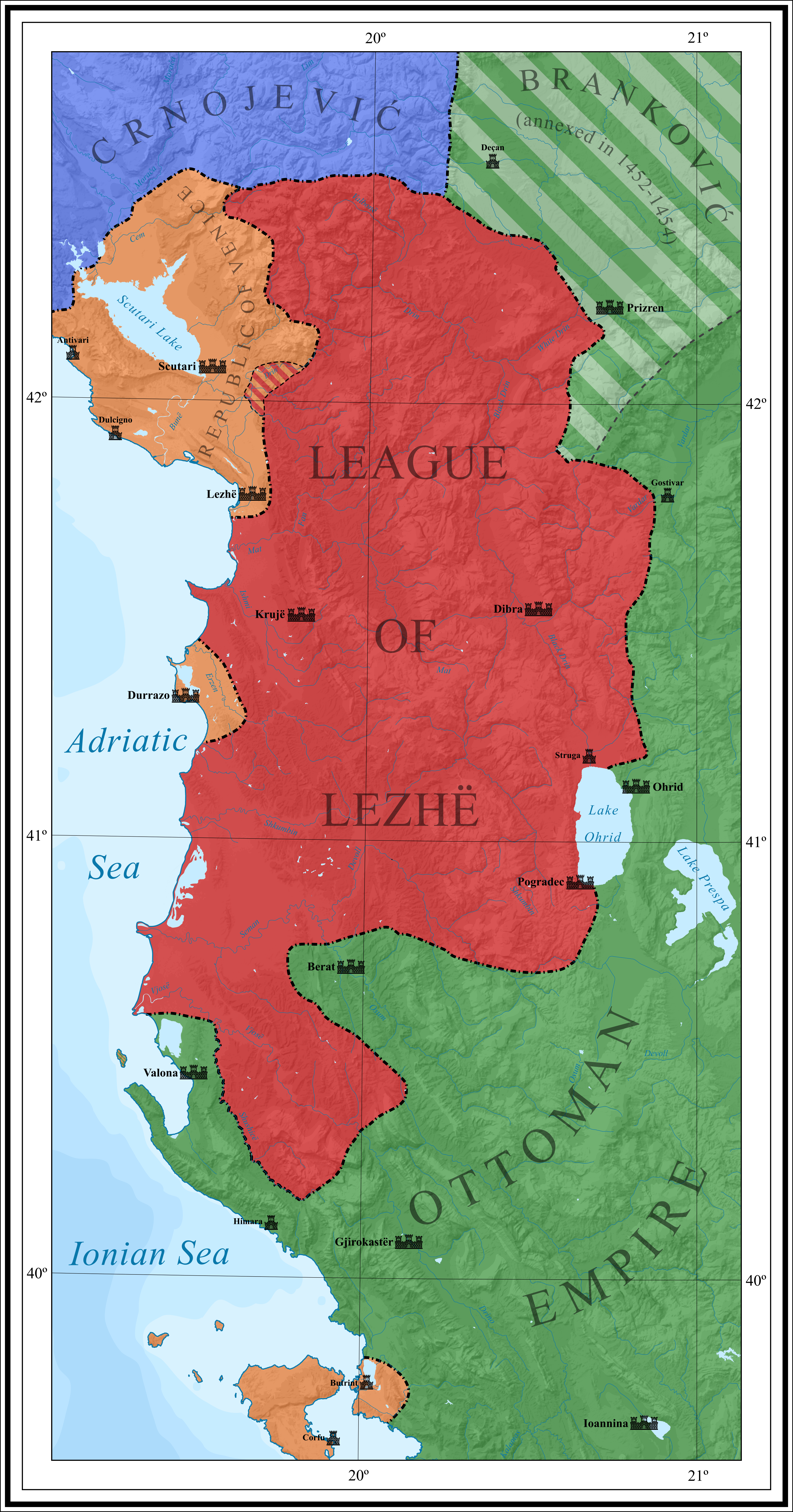
- League of Lezhë between 1448 and 1468
- Leaders: Gjergj Kastrioti (1444–1468); Lekë III Dukagjini (1468–1479)
- Dates active: 1444–1479
- Active regions: Within the League's territories: Principality of Dukagjini; Principality of Zaharia; Principality of Kastrioti; Principality of Arianiti; Principality of Muzaka; Outside of the League's territories: Albania Veneta; Sanjak of Albania; Sanjak of Dibra
- Wars: Albanian–Venetian War; Ottoman–Albanian Wars

The League of Lezhë (Albanian: Lidhja e Lezhës), also commonly referred to as the Albanian League (Albanian: Lidhja Arbërore), was a military and diplomatic alliance of the Albanian aristocracy, created in the city of Lezhë on 2 March 1444. The League of Lezhë is considered the first unified independent Albanian country in the Middle ages, with Skanderbeg as leader of the regional Albanian chieftains and nobles united against the Ottoman Empire until his death in 1468, and then Lekë III Dukagjini led the army and resisted the Ottomans until 1479 when the Ottomans captured Shkodra. Skanderbeg was proclaimed "Chief of the League of the Albanian People," while Skanderbeg always signed himself as "Dominus Albaniae" (Albanian: Zot i Arbërisë, English: Lord of Albania).

At the assembly of Lezhë in 2 March 1444, members from the families Kastrioti, Arianiti, Zaharia, Muzaka, Spani, Thopia, Balsha and Crnojević, which were linked matrilineally or via marriage to the Kastrioti, were present. The members contributed to the league with men and money while maintaining control of the internal affairs of their domains. Soon after its creation, the pro-Venetian Balsha and Crnojevići left the league in the events that led to the Albanian–Venetian War (1447–48). The peace treaty of the Albanian-Venetian war signed on October 4, 1448, is the first diplomatic document on which the league appears as an independent entity. Barleti referred to the meeting as the generalis concilium or universum concilium ("general council" or "whole council"); the term "League of Lezhë" was coined by subsequent historians.

== Background ==
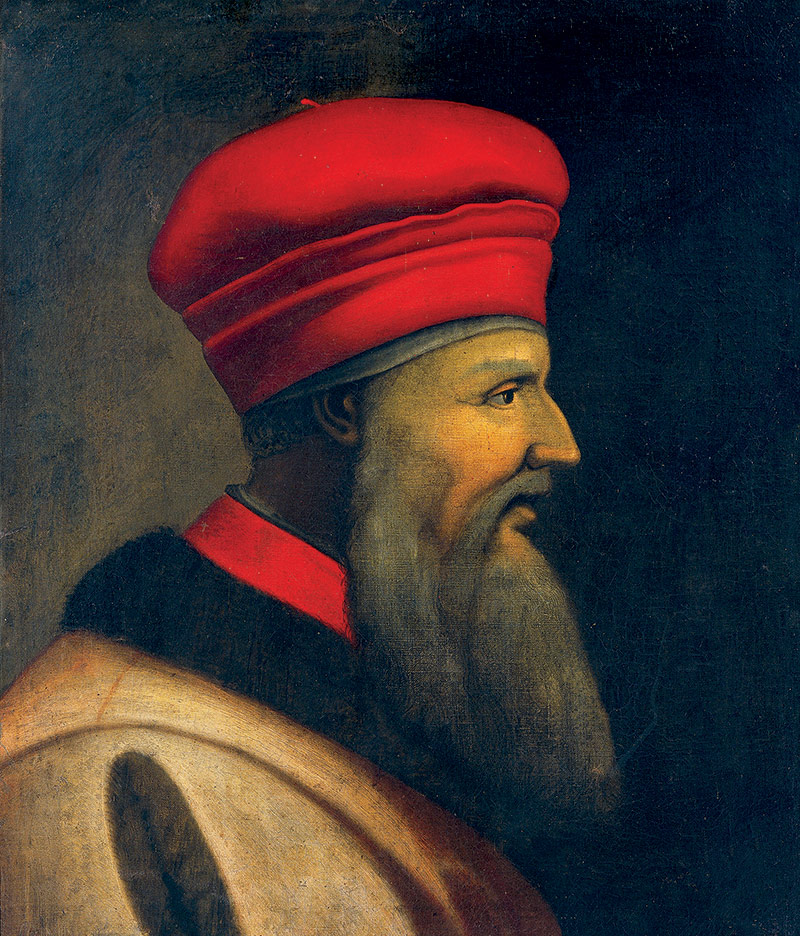
Gjergj Kastrioti known as Skanderbeg, the ruler of Albania from 1444–1468

When Ottoman forces entered Albania, they were faced with various Albanian principalities. The first battle against the Ottoman forces in Albania was the battle of Savra, on September 18, 1385. Karl Thopia invited the Ottomans, who defeated and killed Balsha II, the Lord of Zeta.

In the 15th century, the Ottoman Empire established itself in the Balkans with no significant resistance offered by local Christian nobles. Many of them were still fighting among themselves and did not see the Ottoman advance as a threat to their power. Although a civil war broke out between Bayezid I's sons in 1402–13, none of the Christian noblemen in the Balkans at the time seized the opportunity to repel the Ottomans; on the contrary, Bulgarians, Serbs, and Hungarians even helped the future Sultan Mehmed I seize power by participating as his allies in the final battle against his brother. After the Ottoman civil war was over in favor of Mehmed I, his forces captured Kruja from the Thopia in 1415, Berat in 1417 from the Muzaka, Vlorë and Kaninë in 1417 from Rugjina Balsha, and Gjirokastër in 1418 from the Zenevisi. Under pressure from the Ottoman Empire and the Republic of Venice, the Albanian Principalities began to vacillate. Some Albanian nobility revolted in 1432–36.

In November 1443, Skanderbeg captured Kruja with his troops and declared its independence from the Sultan.

== Formation ==
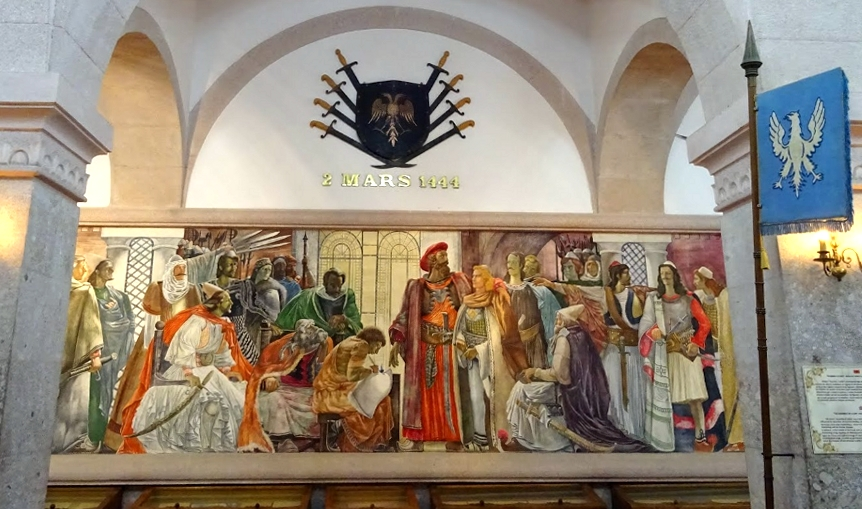
League of Lezhë painting in the Skanderbeg Museum in Krujë.

The League of Lezhë was founded on 2 March 1444 by:

- Lekë Zaharia (lord of Sati and Dagnum), and his vassals Pal and Nicholas Dukagjini
- Pjetër Spani (lord of the mountains behind Drivasto)
- Lekë Dushmani (lord of Minor Pult)
- Gjergj Strez Balsha, Gjon Balsha and Gojko Balsha (lords of Misia, between Kruja and Lezhë)
- Andrea Thopia (lord of Scuria, between Tirana and Durrës) with his nephew Tanush
- Gjergj Arianiti
- Theodor Corona Muzaka
- Stefan Crnojević (lord of Upper Zeta)

Delegates from Venice were present at the meeting. The military alliance was made up of feudal lords in Albania, who had to contribute to the league with men and money. Skanderbeg was proclaimed "Chief of the League of the Albanian People." Thus, he was the League's leader and commander-in-chief of its combined armed forces, which numbered 8,000 warriors. All the territorial lords had their own domains and affairs; "Skanderbeg had no right to interfere with the affairs of the domains of other nobles", acting only as the supreme military leader, as primus inter pares. Barleti referred to the meeting as the generalis concilium or universum concilium ("general council" or "whole council"); the term "League of Lezhë" was coined by subsequent historians.

Initiated and organized under Venetian patronage, through treaties, the league was put under King Alfonso V, with Skanderbeg as captain general.

== History ==
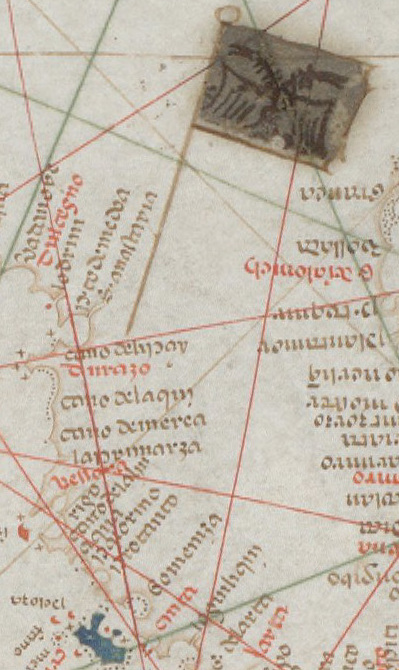
15th-century Flag of Albania

The League's forces had victories against the Ottomans at Torvioll (1444), Mokra (1445), Otonetë (1446), Oranik (1448), a loss at Svetigrad (1448) victory in Polog (1453), victory at Krujë (1450), Albulena (1457), Ohrid (1464), Mokra (1462) and many others.

Skanderbeg's first substantial victory against the Ottomans was at the Battle of Torvioll, and the news of the victory of the Albanians over the Turks spread very quickly in Europe. In the two years that followed, the Albanian-Tetan coalition won over the Ottomans. On May 14, 1450, the first siege of Kruja began, which the Ottomans had to end the following year without success. In 1451, Skanderbeg formed an alliance with the Kingdom of Naples for the time being; however, the Albanians received no help from Naples. In 1452, the Ottomans were defeated at Mokrra and Meçadi. After the fall of Constantinople, Albanians received financial aid from Naples and Venice as well as from the Pope. Until 1462, Skanderbeg's troops were able to defeat the Ottomans every year without significantly weakening their superiority. Every year, the sultan was able to send a new army without difficulty. Only in 1460 and 1463 did ceasefires interrupt the fighting. In 1462, Skanderbeg succeeded in taking the important city of Ohrid.

In 1466, the Second Siege of Krujë was defeated. However, the Ottomans constructed the fortress Elbasan south in the valley of the Shkumbin to support their campaigns. In 1467 a third siege of Kruje failed.

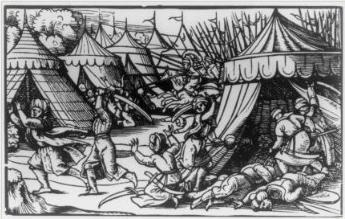
Albanian assault on an Ottoman encampment in the Battle of Albulena

By 1468, the 10,000-strong Skanderbeg army could withstand the Ottomans. The Albanians received financial support from Venice and from the kings of Hungary and Naples. After Skanderbeg died in 1468, the League of Lezha began to disintegrate. Following the Venetians, the Northern Albanians in particular continued the fight against the Ottomans. When the Shkodra, which until then had been dominated by the Venetians, was taken by the Ottomans in 1479, the resistance collapsed, and the entire Albanian settlement area was incorporated into the Ottoman Empire.

There was also a short war between Albania and Venice in 1447–1448, but on October 4, 1448, the Albanian–Venetian War ended when Skanderbeg and Nicholas Dukagjini signed a peace treaty with Venice, which would keep its possessions in Albania, including Dagnum, under the conditions that Venice pay a yearly sum of 1,400 ducats and that some league members would benefit from certain trade privileges, etc.

== Dissolution and aftermath ==
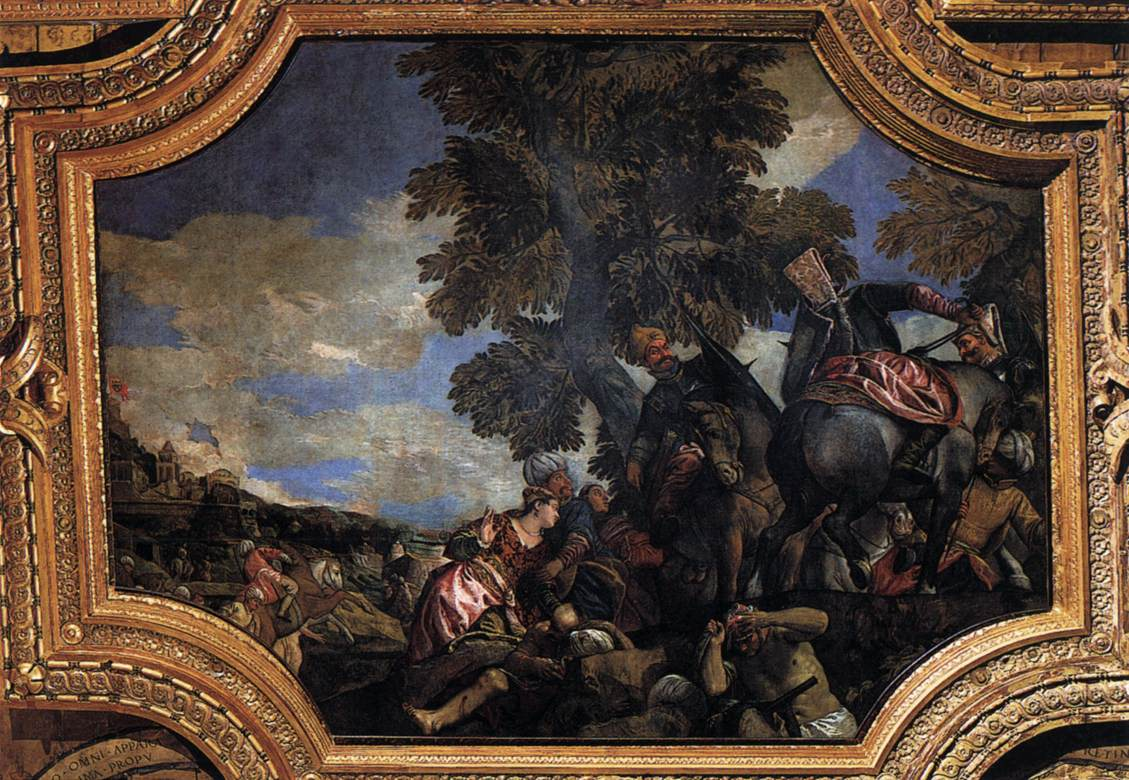
Veronese's Siege of Shkodër in 1478

The alliance was precarious. Although an official date of dissolution is unknown, the League of Lezhë fragmented soon after its founding, with many of its members breaking away. By 1450, it had certainly ceased to function as originally intended, and only the core of the alliance under Skanderbeg and Arianiti continued to fight against the Ottomans. Some members preferred to act in line with their own interests. During the attack on the sultan in 1450, they continued to change their positions between supporting the Ottomans and joining Skanderbeg. After Pjetër Spani and Gjergj Dushmani left the alliance, and after the Arianiti and Dukagjini left it in 1450, members of the Dukagjini family concluded peace with the Ottoman Empire and even began to plot against Skanderbeg.

== Skanderbeg commanders ==
- Gjergj Arianiti
- Hamza Kastrioti, Skanderbeg's nephew, passed to the Ottomans in 1457
- Moisi Arianit Golemi, passed to the Ottomans in 1457
- Vrana Konti
- Vladan Jurica, General Quartermaster Skanderbegs
- Tanush Thopia
- Karl Muzaka Thopia
- Lekë Dukagjini
- Nikollë Dukagjini, passed to the Ottomans in 1457
- Pal III Dukagjini, passed to the Ottomans in 1457
- Pjetër Perlati
- Marin Spani
- Andrea Thopia
- Ajdin Muzaka
- Dhimitër Berisha
- Nik Peta
- Pal Golemi

For 25 years, from 1443–68, Skanderbeg's 10,000-strong army marched through Ottoman territory, winning against increasingly larger and better-supplied Ottoman forces. Threatened by Ottoman advances in their homeland, Hungary, and later Naples and Venice – their former enemies – provided the financial backbone and support for Skanderbeg's army. After Skanderbeg's death in 1468, the Sultan "easily subdued Albania", but Skanderbeg's death did not end the struggle for independence.

== Legacy ==
The League of Lezhë was the basis for an Albanian state. The formation of the League meant that for the first time, Albania was united under an Albanian leader. Some historians regard the League as an independent Albanian state. Others do not accept this view, saying that it was only a military league. However, the League provided the basic elements of Albanian unity.

Skanderbeg and the League of Lezhë have become part of Albanian historiography. That period of history, categorized as a pre-communist time, is seen by many as mythical and unchallengeable. In these cases, struggles against the Ottoman Empire and other foreign powers and processes of national self-definition support the ideological framework linked to that period.

== Monarchs ==
Picture	Title and name	Reign	Notes
	Dominus Albaniae; Gjergj Kastrioti	1444–1468	Skanderbeg initiated the League of Lezhë in 1444 by bringing together prominent Albanian noble families in the city of Lezhë. Proclaiming himself "Chief of the League of the Albanian People", Skanderbeg secured the support of the Albanian nobility to form a united front against the Ottoman Empire.
	Prince of Dukagjini; Lekë Dukagjini	1468–1479	As the last ruler of the League of Lezhë, Lekë played a pivotal role in sustaining Albanian resistance to the Ottoman Empire after Skanderbeg's death in 1468. Despite internal challenges and the eventual capture of Shkodër by the Ottomans in 1479, Dukagjini's leadership was instrumental in the League's efforts to maintain its independence and resist Ottoman conquest.

== Sources ==
- Akademia e Shkencave e Shqipërisë, Instituti i Historisë; K. Prifti; Xh. Gjeçovi; M. Korkuti; G. Shpuza; S. Anamali; K. Biçoku; F. Duka; S. Islami; S. Naçi; F. Prendi; S. Pulaha; P. Xhufi (2002), Historia e Popullit Shqiptar (Vëllimi I) (in Albanian), Tirana, Albania: Toena, ISBN 99927-1-622-3
- Syla, Sabit (2019). "Introduction [Hapja]". In Syla, Sabit; Verli, Marenglen; Asani, Skënder; Berisha, Gjon (eds.). Gjergj Kastrioti – Skënderbeu në 550-vjetorin e vdekjes: (materiale nga Konferenca shkencore ndërkombëtare "Gjergj Kastrioti – Skënderbeu në 550-vjetorin e vdekjes", mbajtur në Prishtinë, më 16 tetor 2018) (PDF) (in Albanian). Institute of history "Ali Hadri". ISBN 978-9951409803.
- Barletius, Marinus (1508), Historia de vita et gestis Scanderbegi Epirotarum Principis (in Latin), Bernardinus de Vitalibus, OCLC 645065473
- Božić, Ivan (1979). Nemirno pomorje XV veka (in Serbian). Belgrade: Srpska književna zadruga. OCLC 5845972.
- Fine, John Van Antwerp (1994). The Late Medieval Balkans: A Critical Survey from the Late Twelfth Century to the Ottoman Conquest. University of Michigan Press. ISBN 978-0-472-08260-5.
- Francione, Gennaro (2006) [2003], Aliaj, Donika (ed.), Skënderbeu, një hero modern: (Hero multimedial) [Skanderbeg, a modern hero (Hero multimedia)] (in Albanian), Translated by Tasim Aliaj, Tiranë, Albania: Shtëpia botuese "Naim Frashëri", ISBN 99927-38-75-8
- Frashëri, Kristo (1964), The history of Albania: a brief survey, s.n., OCLC 1738885
- Frashëri, Kristo (2002), Gjergj Kastrioti Skënderbeu: jeta dhe vepra, 1405–1468 (in Albanian), Botimet Toena, ISBN 99927-1-627-4
- Housley, Norman (1992), The later Crusades, 1274–1580: from Lyons to Alcazar, Oxford University Press, ISBN 978-0-19-822136-4
- Nicol, Donald MacGillivray (1993), The last centuries of Byzantium, 1261–1453, Cambridge University Press, ISBN 978-0-521-43991-6
- Noli, Fan Stilian (1947), George Castrioti Scanderbeg (1405–1468), International Universities Press, OCLC 732882
- Schmitt, Oliver Jens (2001), Das venezianische Albanien (1392–1479), München: R. Oldenbourg Verlag GmbH München, ISBN 3-486-56569-9
- Sedlar, Jean W. (1994), A history of East Central Europe: East Central Europe in the Middle Ages, 1000–1500, University of Washington Press, ISBN 978-0-295-97290-9
- Setton, Kenneth M. (1976), The papacy and the Levant, 1204–1571: The thirteenth and fourteenth centuries, American Philosophical Society, ISBN 978-0-87169-127-9
