= Spani =

Spani is a surname. Notable people with the surname include:

- Spani family
- Pjetër Spani (disambiguation), multiple people
- D. D. Spani, American architect
- Gary Spani (born 1956), American football player
- Hina Spani (1896–1969), Argentine soprano
- Prospero Spani (1516–1584), Italian sculptor
