= Ivan Strez Balšić =

Member of the Balšić noble family

Ivan Strez Balšić Gjon Balsha
- Lord of Malsia
- Died: after 1468
- Noble family: Balšić family
- Father: Stefan Strez-Balšić
- Mother: Vlajka Kastrioti
- Occupation: Member of the League of Lezhë (1444–?)

Ivan Strez Balšić (Serbian Cyrillic: Јован Стрез Балшић; Albanian: Gjon Balsha) or John Balsha fl. 1444–1469) and his brothers George Strez and Gojko Balšić were the lords of Misia, a coastal area from the White Drin towards the Adriatic. The brothers were members of the Balšić family, which earlier held Zeta, but had now placed itself among the nobility in Albania. They participated in founding of the League of Lezhë, an alliance led by their maternal uncle Skanderbeg. Ivan and Gojko supported Skanderbeg until he died in 1468 and then continued to fight against Ottomans together with Venetian forces. After Skanderbeg's death Venice installed Ivan Strez Balšić as Skanderbeg's successor.

== Family ==
According to Gjon Muzaka and Karl Hopf, Ivan Strez Balšić and his brother Gojko were children of Vlajka Kastrioti and Stefan Strez; who was an illegitimate child of Đurađ I Balšić. According to Fan Noli, Ivan had two brothers (George Strez and Gojko) who were all children of Jela Kastrioti and Pavle Balšić. Both views confirm that Gojko was Skanderbeg's nephew.

== Life ==
The three Balšić brothers joined the League of Lezhë, an Albanian alliance formed by their maternal uncle Gjergj Kastrioti Skanderbeg, after meeting in Lezhë on March 2, 1444. The members included Lekë Zaharia, Pjetër Spani, Lekë Dushmani, Andrea Thopia, Gjergj Arianiti, Theodor Muzaka, Stefan Crnojević, and their subjects. Skanderbeg was elected its leader, and commander in chief of its armed forces numbering a total of 8,000 warriors.

Ivan was the commander of a unit of 500 cavalry sent by Skanderbeg to support Ferdinand I of Naples, whose rulership was threatened by the Angevin Dynasty, before Skanderbeg himself led a military expedition to Italy.

Ivan Strez Balšić was perceived by Venice as Skanderbeg's successor. After Skanderbeg's death Ivan and his brother Gojko Balšić, together with Leke, Progon and Nicholas Dukagjini, continued to fight for Venice. In 1469 Ivan requested from the Venetian Senate to return him his confiscated property consisting of Castle Petrela, woivodate of "Terra nuova" of Kruje (unknown position), territory between Kruje and Durrës and villages in the region of Bushnesh (today part of the Kodër-Thumanë municipality). Venice largely conceded to the wishes of Ivan Balšić and installed him as Skanderbeg's successor.

== Death ==
The Venetian chronicler Stefano Magno recorded details about Ivan's death. Ivan insisted that Venetian grain supplies to the Ottoman besieged Krujë could only be transported through his territory after a yearly licence was paid to him. The Venetian governor of Scutari, Leonardo Boldù, realised that Ivan's requests could have serious consequences. He gathered forces consisting of Venetian militia from Scutari, commanded by their voivoda and joined with the forces of many noble families from Albania who were loyal to Venice. Ivan Balšić prepared an ambush in the house where he met with Venetians but they managed to kill Ivan in the ensuing fight and threw his head out of the house in front of his stunned followers.

== Annotations ==
1. Name: His full name was Ivan Strez Balšić (). In Venetian documents his name is recorded as Joan Stresci. Other versions of his first name include Đon (Albanian: Gjon) and John.
2. League of Lezhe:
  - Lekë Zaharia (lord of Sati and Dagnum) and his vassals Pal Dukagjin and Nicholas Dukagjini
  - Peter Spani (lord of the mountains behind Drivasto)
  - Lekë Dushmani (lord of Pult)
  - George, Ivan and Gojko Balšić
  - Andrea Thopia with nis nephew Tanush Thopia
  - Gjergj Arianiti
  - Theodor Corona Musachi
  - Stefan Crnojević with his sons Ivan, Andrija and Božidar

== Sources ==
- Noli, Fan Stilian (1947), George Castrioti Scanderbeg (1405–1468), International Universities Press, OCLC 732882
- Schmitt, Oliver Jens (2001), Das venezianische Albanien (1392–1479) (in German), München: R. Oldenbourg Verlag GmbH München, ISBN 3-486-56569-9
- Schmitt, Oliver Jens; Clewing, Konrad; Hösch, Edgar (2005), Südosteuropa : von vormoderner Vielfalt und nationalstaatlicher Vereinheitlichung : Festschrift für Edgar Hösch (in German), Oldenbourg Verlag, ISBN 978-3-486-57888-1, OCLC 62309552
- Gopčević, Spiridon (1914). Geschichte von Montenegro und Albanien (in German). Gotha: F.A. Perthes. OCLC 9968504.
- Božić, Ivan (1979), Nemirno pomorje XV veka (in Serbian), Beograd: Srpska književna zadruga, OCLC 5845972
