= Pjetër Spani =

Pjetër or Peter Spani may refer to:

- Peter Spani (League of Lezhë), nobleman of northern Albania
- Pjetër Spani (bishop), Bishop of Bar, of the Spani family
