= Treaty of Gaeta =

1451 treaty between Naples and Albania

- Signed: March 26, 1451
- Location: Gaeta
- Signatories: Arnaldo Fonolleda; Stefan, Bishop of Krujë and Nikollë de Berguçi
- Parties: Kingdom of Naples; Skanderbeg

The Treaty of Gaeta was a political treaty signed in Gaeta on March 26, 1451, between Alfonso V for the Kingdom of Naples and Stefan, Bishop of Krujë, and Nikollë de Berguçi, ambassadors of Skanderbeg. In the treaty Skanderbeg recognized himself a vassal of the Kingdom of Naples, and in return he would have the Kingdom's protection from the Ottoman Empire. Alfonso V believed that he would be able to resurrect the politics of his Angevine predecessors and to use Albania as a foothold to further expand his realm into the Balkans.

== Terms of the Treaty ==
The treaty was requested by Skanderbeg in order to ensure protection from the Ottoman Empire. Although the party on the treaty was Alfonso V himself, the treaty was signed by his main notary, Arnaldo Fonolleda. The ambassadors of Skanderbeg were respectively two bishops: Stefan was an Orthodox bishop, and de Berguçi was a Catholic (Dominican) bishop.

According to the treaty, if the Albanians were to need the Kingdom of Naples's help in military issues, they would be obligated to donate each city in danger to the Naple's crown. In addition Skanderbeg had to swear an oath of fidelity to the Aragon crown. As soon as the Albanian lands were freed from Ottoman invasions, Skanderbeg had to pay taxes to Alfonso, and had to recognize the Naple's crown, however he would keep his autonomy and self-government. The last point of the treaty specifies that Skanderbeg had to buy salt only from the warehouses of Alfonso, rather than from the Ottomans, but with the same price that the Ottomans would have otherwise charged. To follow the treaty, Naples sent a detachment of 100 Neapolitan soldiers commanded by Bernard Vaquer to the castle of Krujë in late May 1451. Vaquer was appointed to position of special commissioner and took over Kruje on behalf of the Kingdom of Naples and put its garrison under his command.

== Aftermath ==
After Alfonso signed this treaty with Skanderbeg, he signed similar treaties with other chieftains from Albania: Gjergj Arianiti, Gjin Muzaka, George Strez Balšić, Peter Spani, Paul Dukagjini, Constantinos Spanchis, Thopia Muzaka, Peter of Himara, Simon Zenebishi and Carlo II Tocco.
