= Pult (village) =

- Administrative unit
- Location within Albania
- Coordinates: 42°14′N 19°42′E
- Country: Albania
- County: Shkodër
- Municipality: Shkodër
  - Administrative unit: 132.4 km^{2} (51.1 sq mi)

Population (2023)
  - Administrative unit: 245
  - Administrative unit density: 1.85/km^{2} (4.79/sq mi)
- Time zone: UTC+1 (CET)
  - Summer (DST): UTC+2 (CEST)

Pult (Latin: Pulati) is a municipal unit in Shkodër County in northwestern Albania.The population as of the 2023 census is 245.

== History ==
Formerly a municipality, at the 2015 local government reform it became a municipal unit of the municipality of Shkodër.

It was the seat of a Latin Catholic Diocese of Pult (Latin name Pulati) since 900, until it was suppressed on 25 January 2005 by absorption into the Metropolitan Roman Catholic Archdiocese of Shkodrë–Pult, its title being incorporated therein.

== Demographics ==
Pult recorded the largest population decline out of any municipal unit in the country from the 2011 census to the 2023 census.

Historical population
Year	Pop.	±%
1989	4,134	—
2001	2,422	−41.4%
2011	1,529	−36.9%
2023	245	−84.0%

== Sources and external links ==
- GigaCatholic former diocese
