= George Strez Balšić =

George Strez Balšić Gjergj Strez Balsha
- Ruler of Balšić; Lord of Misia
- Coat of arms
- Full name: George Strezov Balšić
- Born: Before 1400
- Died: 1468; Šas (Present-day Montenegro)
- Cause of death: Starvation
- Noble family: Balšić family
- Spouse: Eudokia Balšić
- Issue: Giorgio Balšić; Mara Balšić
- Father: Pavle Balšić
- Mother: Jelena Kastrioti
- Occupation: Member of the League of Lezhë (1444-?)

George Strez Balšić (Serbian Cyrillic: Ђурађ Стрезов Балшић; Albanian: Gjergj Balsha) or Gjergj Strez Balsha (fl. 1444–57) and his brothers Gojko and Ivan were the lords of Misia, a coastal area from the White Drin towards the Adriatic. The brothers were members of the Balšić noble family, which had earlier held Zeta. They participated in founding of the League of Lezhë, an alliance led by their maternal uncle Skanderbeg. George later betrayed Skanderbeg, by selling a domain to the Ottomans, while his two brothers continued to support Skanderbeg until his death and then continued to fight for the Venetian forces.

== Family ==
According to Fan S. Noli, George and his brothers Ivan and Gojko were nephews of Skanderbeg from his sister Jelena who married Pavle Balšić. The genealogy of the Kastrioti family written by Karl Hopf does not present the information about George Strez Balšić being a son of Skanderbeg's sister Jelena.

== League of Lezhë ==
The three Balšić brothers joined the League of Lezhë, an alliance formed by their maternal uncle Skanderbeg, after meeting in the St. Nicholas Church in Lezhë on 2 March 1444. The members included Lekë Zaharia, Peter Spani, Lekë Dushmani, Andrea Thopia, Gjergj Arianiti, Theodor Musachi, Stefan Crnojević, and their subjects. Skanderbeg was elected the alliance's leader, and commander-in-chief of its armed forces numbering a total of 8,000 warriors.

In 1451 after Alfonso signed the Treaty of Gaeta with Skanderbeg, he signed similar treaties with George Strez Balšić and other chieftains from Albania: Gjergj Arianiti, Gjin Muzaka, Peter Spani, Pal Dukagjini, Thopia Muzaka, Peter of Himara, Simon Zenebishi and Carlo II Tocco.

According to Albanian historians Kristo Frashëri and Fan Noli, Strez Balšić betrayed Skanderbeg by selling the fortress he controlled (Modritza) to the Ottoman Empire in spring 1457. Skanderbeg was betrayed by another of his nephews, Hamza Kastrioti, who deserted to the Ottomans.

== Issue ==
Karl Krumbacher believed that the first daughter of Muriq Shpata married Giorgio, a son of "George Balšić and Eudokia".

== Annotations ==
1. Name: His full name in Serbian is written Đurađ Strezov Balšić (Ђурађ Стрезов Балшић), while in Latin and Italian his name was written Georgio Stresio. His given name is also rendered Georg, Georgi, Gjorgje, Đerđ, Gjergj and Đurađ (Serbian: Ђурађ). His family name also appears in versions such as Stres, Stresi, Stresio, Strez, Strezov or Sturz. .
2. League of Lezhe:
  - Lekë Zaharia (lord of Sati and Dagnum) and his vassals Pal Dukagjin and Nicholas Dukagjini
  - Peter Spani (lord of the mountains behind Drivasto)
  - Lekë Dushmani (lord of Pult)
  - George, Ivan and Gojko Balšić
  - Andrea Thopia with nis nephew Tanush Thopia
  - Gjergj Arianiti
  - Theodor Corona Musachi
  - Stefan Crnojević with his sons Ivan, Andrija and Božidar

== Sources ==
- Božić, Ivan (1979), Nemirno pomorje XV veka (in Serbian), Beograd: Srpska književna zadruga, OCLC 5845972
- Elsie, Robert (2005), Albanian literature: a short history, London: I.B. Tauris in association with the Centre for Albanian Studies, ISBN 1845110315
- Fine, John Van Antwerp (1994), The Late Medieval Balkans: A Critical Survey from the Late Twelfth Century to the Ottoman Conquest, University of Michigan Press, ISBN 978-0472082605
- Frashëri, Kristo (1964), The history of Albania: a brief survey, s.n., OCLC 1738885
- Hopf, Carl Hermann Friedrich Johann (1873). Chroniques Gréco-Romanes Inédites ou peu Connues. Berlin, Germany: Librairie de Weidmann.
- Noli, Fan Stilian (1947), George Castrioti Scanderbeg (1405-1468), International Universities Press, OCLC 732882
- Schmitt, Oliver Jens (2001), Das venezianische Albanien (1392-1479) (in German), München: R. Oldenbourg Verlag GmbH München, ISBN 3-486-56569--9
- Srpska akademija nauka i umetnosti (SANU, Serbian Academy of Sciences and Arts) (1890), Glas, Volume 22 (in Serbian), Serbian Academy of Sciences and Arts
