= Vladan Jurica =

Chief quartermaster of the League of Lezhe

Vladan Gjurica
- Died: April 1465; Constantinople, Ottoman Empire
- Occupation: Military Commander
- Known for: Advisor of Skanderbeg during the Skanderbeg's rebellion

Vladan Gjurica (d. April 1465) was an Albanian nobleman and Skanderbeg's main advisor during Skanderbeg's rebellion.

== Life and death ==
He is thought to be from Gjoricë, in modern-day Dibër County from which he got the surname Gjurica/Jurica. He was most likely a member of the Arianiti family. During the wedding of Mamica Kastrioti, it is recorded that he was wounded in the head during a clash between Lekë Dukagjini and Lekë Zaharia over Irene Dushmani.

During the Battle of Vajkal he was captured by the Ottoman troops and sent to Constantinople where he was tortured and skinned alive.
