= Socerb Castle =

Coordinates: 45.5898°N 13.8608°E

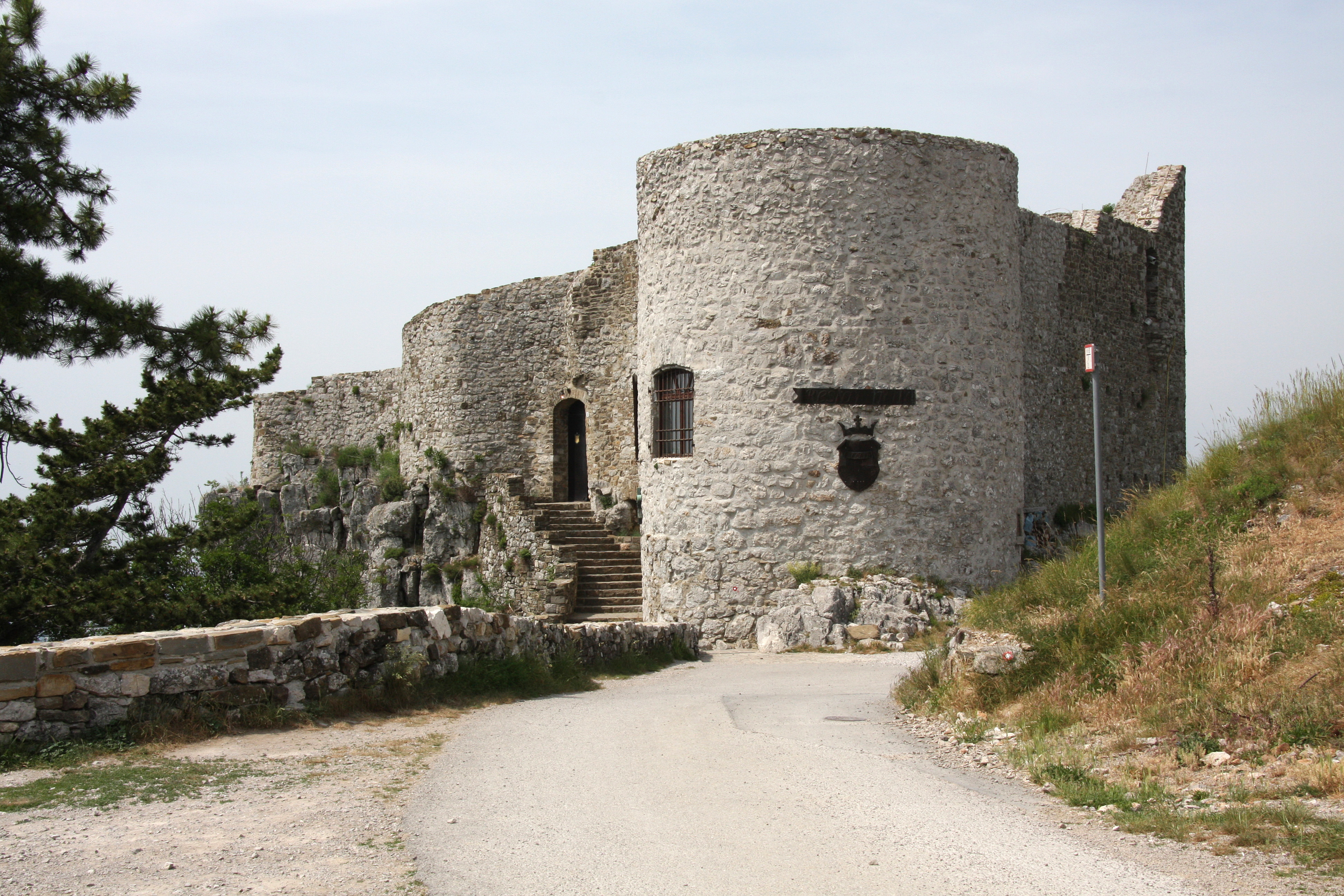
Socerb Castle

The Socerb Castle (In Slovenian: Grad Socerb; In Italian: Castello di San Servolo), is a castle located near the village of Socerb in the Municipality of Koper in Slovenia, a short distance from the Italian–Slovenian border. It is a fortress built on a cliff more than 350 meters high.

It was built to defend the territory from the Hungarians. The initial core presumably dates back to the 9th century, and was later expanded over the centuries. It was the scene of numerous battles and, in particular, the one fought between the Austrians and Venetians at the beginning of the 16th century for control of the salt trade that occurred in the Zaule salt mines and ran through the Val Rosandra.

It was owned by the Venetians from 1463 to 1511, who used it as an extreme defense against the Turks and the Austrian Empire. In 1521, the captain and nobleman of Trieste Nicolò Rauber became its owner. At the beginning of the 17th century, during the Uskok War (1615-1617), the castle belonged to the Trieste nobleman Benvenuto Petazzi. In 1768 it was acquired by the Montecuccoli counts of Modena, who retained the property even after the abolition of serfdom in 1848.

Due to damage caused by a fire caused by lightning in 1780, the castle fell into ruins in the early 19th century. What remained of the castle was purchased in 1907 by the Baron of Trieste, Demetrio Economo, who renovated it in 1925, repairing the surrounding wall and removing the other ruins. In World War II, during the period of the liberation struggle, thanks to its strategic position, it was used as a headquarters first by the German army and then by the partisan militias after their conquest in the autumn of 1944. After the war, it was renovated again and assumed historical and touristic importance.
