= Yakup Bey Muzaka =

Ottoman governor of Albania in 1437 and 1441–42

Jakup Muzaka Bey
- Born: (now Albania)
- Died: September 1442; Ialomița River (now Romania)
- Relatives: Teodor III Muzaka (father)
- Military career
- Allegiance: (Ottoman Empire)
- Service years: fl. 1437–42
- Rank: sanjak-bey
- Conflicts: Battle at the Ialomița River

Yakup Bey (Albanian: Jakup Beu; fl. 1437 – September 1442) was the sanjak-bey of Albania in 1437.

== Life ==
Jakup was born into the Albanian noble Muzaka family. During the revolt staged by his father, Teodor III Muzaka, he was replaced by Hadım Şehabeddin (sanjak-bey until 1439), then served again in 1441–42, when in 1441 Përmet was annexed to the sanjak of Albania, Yakup Bey is mentioned as its sanjakbey. He remained on the position of the sanjakbey of the Sanjak of Albania until September 1442 when he was killed in action along with 16 other sanjak-beys under the command of Hadım Şehabeddin (since 1439 the beylerbey of the Rumelia Eyalet) at the battle near the Ialomița River against Christian forces under Janos Hunyadi.

== Descendants ==
Through Murat of Këlcyrë, who was the great-grandfather of Ali Pasha of Ioannina and grandfather of Veli Bey of Tepelena, Ali Pasha was a descendant of Jakup Muzaka.

Preceded by Ali Bey	sanjak-bey of Albania; 1437	Succeeded by Hadım Şehabeddin
Preceded by Hadım Şehabeddin	sanjak-bey of Albania; 1441–42	Succeeded by ?
