= Nicholas Pal Dukagjini =

Albanian nobleman and military commander (fl. 15th century)

Nicholas II Dukagjini
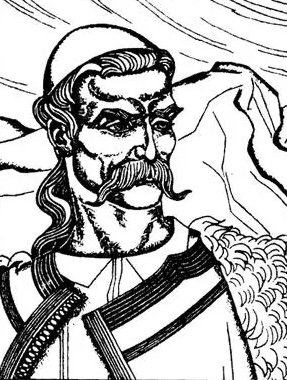
- Sketch of Nicholas Dukagjini

Prince of Dukagjini
- Reign: 1481–1484
- Predecessor: Lekë III Dukagjini
- Full name: Nikollë Pal Dukagjini
- Born: Before 1411
- Noble family: Dukagjini family
- Spouse: Chiranna Arianiti
- Issue: Progon Dukagjini

Nicholas II Dukagjini (Albanian: Nikollë II Dukagjini) was an Albanian nobleman of the Dukagjini family in the 15th century. He was the son of Pal Dukagjini, one of the founding members of the League of Lezhë. Nicholas Dukagjini fled to Italy after the fall of Shkodra in 1479, but is well known for the return to his homeland two years later, together with Skanderbeg's son Gjon Kastrioti and other noblemen to lead the armed movement against the Ottomans.

== Life ==
Nicholas Dukagjini was the son of Pal Dukagjini (1411–1458). He had three brothers: Lekë, Progon, and Gjergj, of whom only Lekë was politically notable and is often mentioned besides his brother. Nicholas Dukagjini married Chiranna Arianiti, daughter of Gjergj Arianiti, and had one child that survived, a son Progon.

After the death of Skanderbeg in 1468, Nicholas Dukagjini and his brothers Lekë and Progon were allied to Venice. In 1471, Nicholas’ brother Progon is mentioned as dead.

Following the Ottoman retreat after the first Siege of Shkodra in August 1474, the Turkish army destroyed and burned the inhabited surrounding region, including the castle of Dagnum, despite a strong resistance led by the brothers Nicholas and Lekë Dukagjini. The Ottoman Empire captured Krujë in June 1478, and shortly afterwards, Drivast and Alessio (Lezhë). Many local fighters were engaged in the defense of the town during the second Siege of Shkodra between 1478 and 1479, including several ex-warriors of Skanderbeg. Teodor and Budomir Dukagjini, two cousins of Nicholas, were among the fallen in this battle.

On January 25, 1479, the Republic of Venice signed the Treaty of Constantinople with the Ottoman Empire, according to which, the city of Shkodra was ceded to the Ottomans, on condition that its citizens would be free to leave. Eventually, on April 25, 1479 the Ottoman forces entered Shkodra, which triggered massive emigrations of the local people, mostly towards Venice. Several noblemen and notable political figures fled to Italy, including Nicholas Dukagjini and his brother Lekë Dukagjini.

=== Return to Albania and early 1480s uprisings ===
Following the death of Sultan Mehmed II on 3 May 1481 and the following civil unrest that broke out in the Ottoman Empire, hope rose to the leaders in exile for a successful return against the Ottomans in their countries and to restore their former principalities. In early summer 1481, Nicholas Dukagjini and Lekë Dukagjini returned to Albania. The Rector of Ragusa wrote to the king Ferdinand I of Naples (Ferrante), informing him on June 2, 1481, that Prince Vlatko had returned to Bosnia, while Nicholas Dukagjini went to Albania to join the armed movements against the Ottomans.

Gjon II Kastrioti, who had been fighting the Ottomans in Otranto, sailed to Albania in four Neapolitan ships (galera) with his cousin Konstandin Muzaka. He disembarked south of Durrës, Konstandin sailed further south to Himara, while Nicholas and Lekë Dukagjini headed to Upper Albania, in the highlands of Alessio (Lezhë) and Shkodra, where they led the uprising in the north. Nicholas and Lekë's forces attacked the town of Shkodra and forced Hadım Suleiman Pasha to send further military reinforcements in the region. Konstandin carried military actions in the coastal region of Himarë, meanwhile an Albanian infantry of 7,000 was gathered around Gjon Kastrioti. Gjon severely defeated an Ottoman army of 2,000 to 3,000, captured Himara on August 31, 1481 and later Sopot (Borshi) Castle and took captive Hadım Suleiman Pasha, who was sent to Naples as a trophy of the victory and eventually was set free under a ransom of 20,000 ducats.

The military campaigns led by Nicholas and Lekë Dukagjini in the northern highlands and by Kastrioti and Muzaka in central and southern Albania were conducted to impede new Ottoman troops to reach Italy and their transient success had an external impact on the liberation of Otranto on September 10, 1481.

== Legacy ==
Nicholas' son, Progon had returned to Albania from Italy, to lead an anti-Ottoman rebellion that broke out in northern Albania in 1501. Eventually he signed an agreement with the Ottomans and was given the title Pasha of Rumelia, as well as the dominion over a part of the Dukagjini properties in the form of timar.
