= Dukagjini family =

Albanian noble family

Dukagjini Dukagjinët
- Noble family
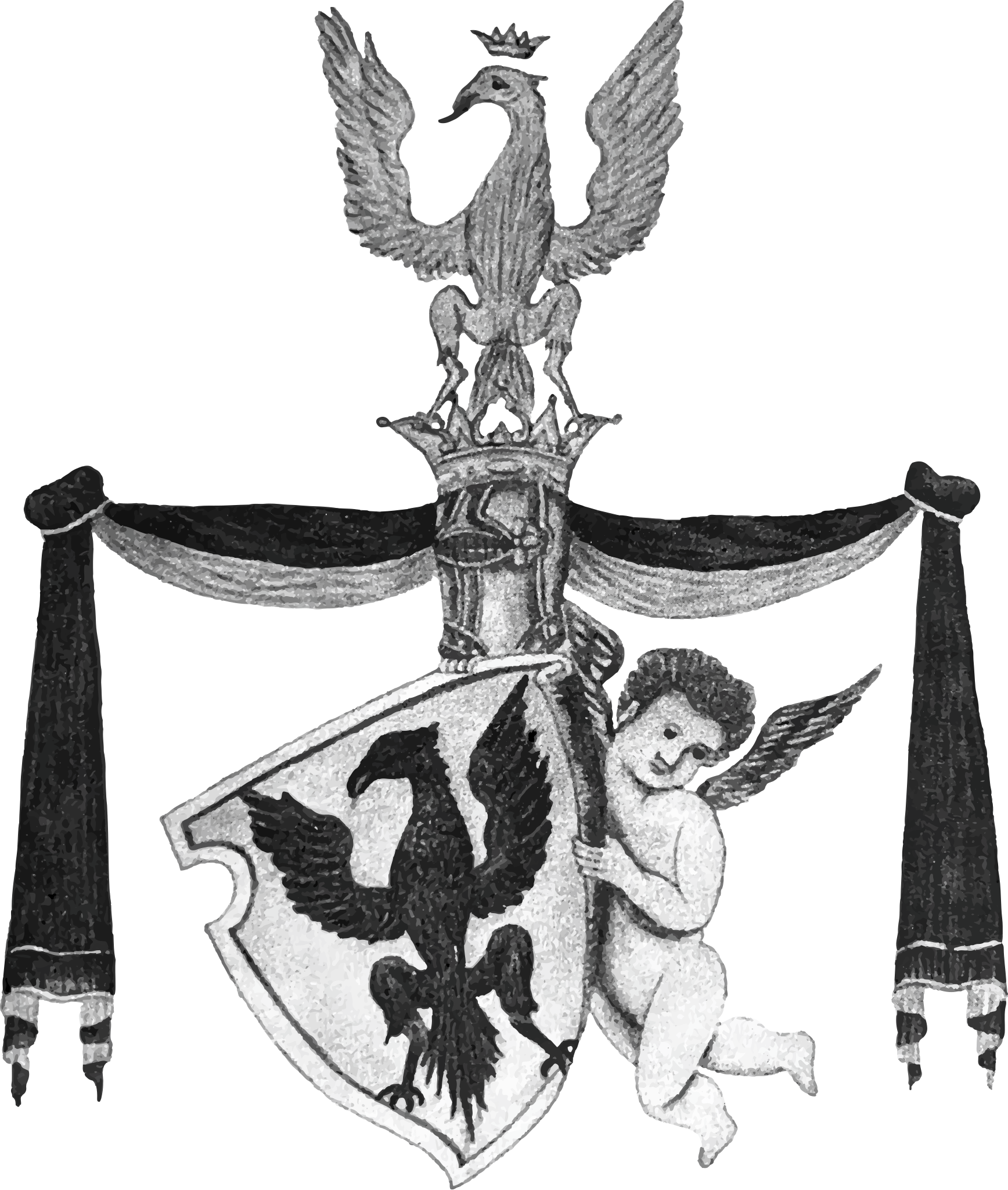
- The earliest artistic depiction of the Dukagjini coat of arms, a 14th century miniature, was published in the monthly periodical YLLI – issue nr.6, 7th annual edition (p.20)
- Country: Medieval Albania
- Current region: Lezhë
- Founded: 14th century
- Founder: Gjin Tanushi (duca Ginium Tanuschium Albanensem)
- Members: Pal Dukagjini; Nicholas Dukagjini; Nicholas Pal Dukagjini; Lekë Dukagjini; Bosa Dukagjini
- Cadet branches: Dukaginzade Ahmed Pasha; Dukakinzade Mehmed Pasha; Dukaginzade Yahya Bey
- Website: dukagjini.org

The House of Dukagjini is an Albanian noble family which ruled over an area of Northern Albania and Western Kosovo known as the Principality of Dukagjini in the 14th and 15th centuries. They may have been descendants of the earlier Progoni family, who founded the first Albanian state in recorded history, the Principality of Arbanon. The city of Lezhë was their most important holding.

== History ==
The Dukagjini evolved from an extended clan (farefisni) to a feudal family in the late 13th century, when their first known progenitor Gjin Tanushi who became known as a dux (duke) and thus his descendants took the surname Dukagjini. By the early 15th century, they had evolved in one of the most important feudal families in the country. After the Ottoman conquest of Albania, a branch of them found refuge and settled in Venetian Koper, where they became known as the Docaini family which held the governorship of Socerb Castle until the early 17th century, when the last male line Docaini died. Another branch, converted to Islam from Catholic Christianity and remained in the Ottoman Empire, where they reached the high ranks of Ottoman leadership and produced many governors (pashas) in the Middle East, where descendants of them live in the modern period.

Lekë Dukagjini is the best known member of the clan in Albania. He is remembered in oral tradition as the codifier of the best remembered Kanun (customary law) of Albania. Another Dukagjini is Yahya bey who was a famous diwan poet of the 16th century.

== Name ==
The name Dukagjini is a compound of the personal name Gjin and the title duka (duke). The Dukagjini are descendants of an aristocrat named Gjin Tanushi who lived in the late 13th century. He is mentioned in 1281 in a letter of the captain of Angevine Durazzo as duca Ginium Tanuschium Albanensem. The earlier family name of Gjin Tanush may be Progoni as he was likely a descendant of this family. Archival documents of this era from Ragusa and Italy spell the name usually as Ducagini/Duchaginni. The Dukagjini who settled in Istria became known as the Ducaini or Docaini. In Ottoman Turkish, the Dukagjini became known as Dukaginzâde or Dukakinoğlu.

== Origins ==
Armorial of the Istria branch of the Dukagjini as depicted in Prospero Petronio's manuscript "Sacred and Profane Memoirs of Istria"

The Dukagjini family was part of an extended clan (farefisni) with several branches. The main branches in the early 15th century were those of Shkodër and Dibra and that of Lezhë. The extent of the fis in various regions is indicated in the names of three different areas: Leknia (named after one of the several Lekë Dukagjini) which extends from Mirdita to Malësia, the Dukagjin highlands to its north, and Rrafshi i Dukagjinit in western Kosovo. The first known ancestor of the Dukagjini who gave his name to the family was an Albanian military figure, Gjin Tanushi, who in 1281 became known with the title of dux (ducam Ginium Tanuschium Albanensem). He may have been a relative or a descendant of the earlier Progoni via protosevastos Progon, son of Gjin Progoni. The rule of this Progon in the Mirdita area, the many similarities between the emblem of the Progoni family in the Gëziq inscription and the coat of arms of the later Dukagjini and the claim of the Dukagjini that they were the hereditary overlords of Ndërfandë and the abbacy of Gëziq has led historians to consider that the two clans may have been related or even that the Dukagjini were descendants of the Progoni via protosevastos Progon.

Gjin Tanushi is mentioned as an enemy of the Angevin rule in Albania who was later captured and imprisoned for his actions. Gjon Muzaka wrote the first account about the origins of the Dukagjini in 1510. He describes an illustrious origin from Troy, after which they found refuge in France. From that country, two brothers came southwards again. One settled in Italy and was the progenitor of the Dukes of Ferrara and the other Duke Gjin came in Albania and took over the area of Zadrima. Gjon Muzaka's genealogies are considered highly dubious historically, but of value about what they reflect about their author and his era. Muzaka was married to Maria Dukagjini, a descendant of the family. Another such oral story which has been recorded in the archives of the Republic of Ragusa names them as regional rebels in the 7th century AD, who had twice attacked the city.

A person with the Dukagjini name was mentioned in a 1377 document in Dubrovnik, as Nicolaus Tuderovich Duchaghi. It is not possible to connect this person as being a relative of any other member of the Dukagjini family.

== History ==
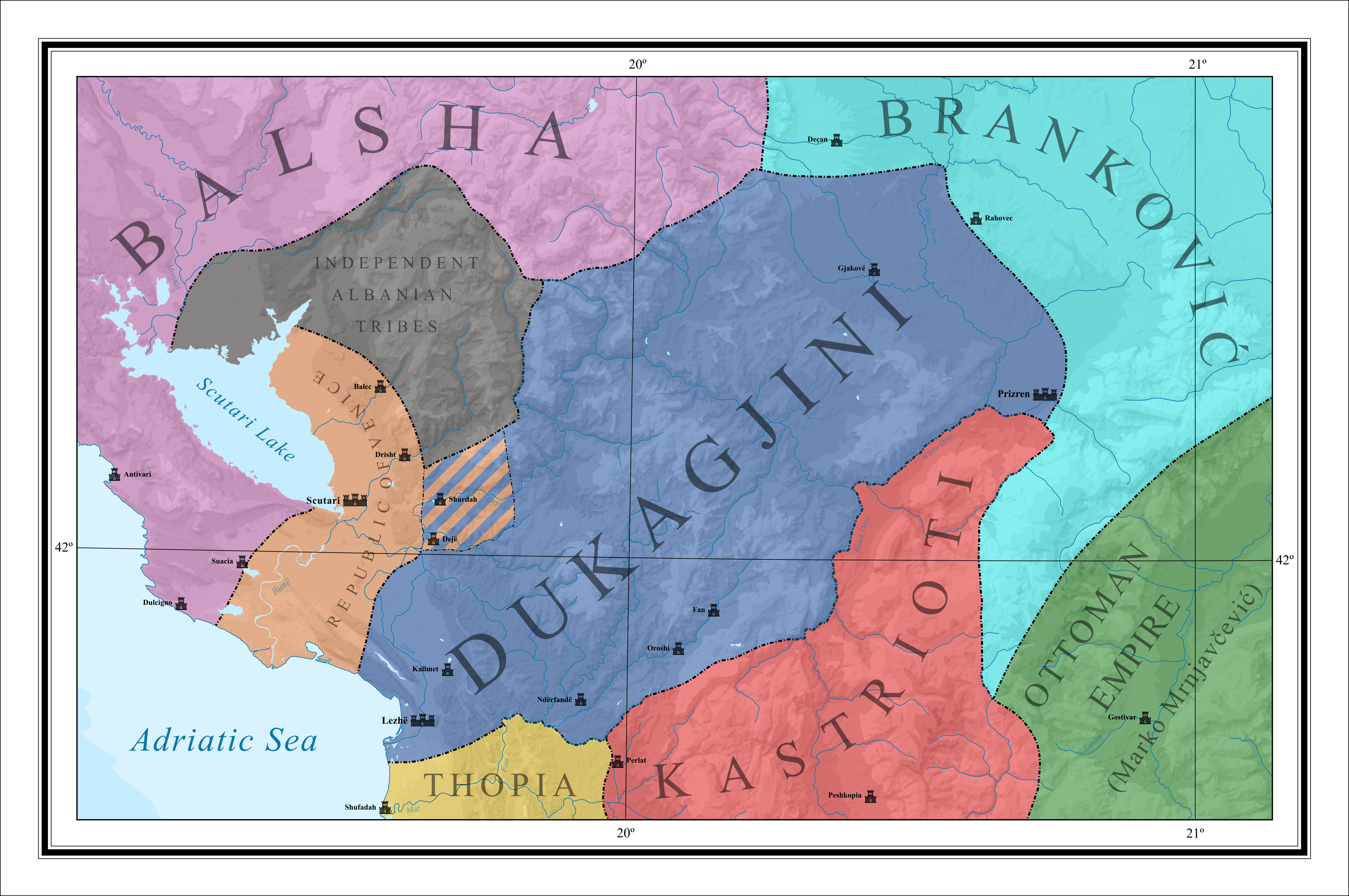
Lands of the Dukagjini in late 14th century.

In the 15th century, sources appear for two separate branches of the Dukagjin family. The representative of one branch, Gjergj Dukagjini, appears as an owner of some villages near Lezhë and a commander of a force of 40 cavalry and 100 infantry. Although the Venetian Senate accepted his services, believing in his loyalty, he supported Zetan lord Balša III and fought against Venice when Balša III captured Venetian possessions near Scutari. Gjergj Dukagjini died before 1409. In 1409, the Venetian Senate pardoned his son Nikola (Nikollë) for the activities of his father, based on the request of Dhimitër Jonima.

According to the chronicle of Gjon Muzaka, Gjergj Dukagjini had three sons, Gjergj, Tanush, and Nicholas Dukagjini. Nicholas is first mentioned in a document dated to 1409. In 1443 he was a participant in the League of Lezhë, as vassal of Lekë Zaharia. Already in 1444 Nicholas killed Zaharia and tried to capture his pronoia, but failed to capture it, except Sati and several villages without a fight. After Skanderbeg's war against Venice he signed a peace treaty with Venetians. Together with many other Albanian noblemen (such as Moisi Arianit Golemi, Pal Dukagjini and Hamza Kastrioti) he abandoned Skanderbeg's forces and deserted to the Ottomans. Ottomans allowed him to govern 25 villages in Debar and 7 villages in Fandi. Nicholas died before 1454. His sons, Draga and Gjergj Dukagjini who were killed around 1462, ambushed by other nobleman from Albania, played minor political roles.

The Dukagjini remained neutral during the First Scutari War. They supported Serbian Despot Stefan Lazarević during the Second Scutari War until January 1423, when they, alongside some other nobility, were bribed over by the Venetians. They were never mobilized, but left the ranks of Despot Stefan. Although Venetian admiral Francesco Bembo offered money to Gjon Kastrioti II, the Dukagjini and to Koja Zaharija in April 1423 to join the Venetian forces against the Serbian Despotate, they refused.

The names of the other branches of Dukagjini's family are mentioned in a Ragusian document from 1387. The brothers Lekë and Paul Dukagjini are described as owners of Lezhë who secured a free pass to Ragusan merchants in their dominion.

Pal Dukagjini (died 1393) had five sons named Tanush (the Little), Progon, Pal (II), Andrea, and Gjon Dukagjini. Pal II Dukagjini was killed in 1402 in Dalmatia while he was returning from Venice; Progon died in 1394. In a later document, Tanush appears as an ally of Koja Zaharia and appears to have died somewhere before 1433. Andrea Dukagjini died in 1416, while his brother Gjon became a priest and appears to have died in 1446.

Lekë Dukagjini had two sons, Progon and Tanush (Major) Dukagjini, and one daughter, Bosa Dukagjini, who was married to Koja Zaharia. Progon Dukagjini married Voisava Thopia, daughter of Karl Thopia, and appears to have been killed in 1402 under Venetian service. Tanush (Major) Dukagjini moved into Shkodër with his family, composed of two sons Pal and Lekë Dukagjini and two girls, of whom we only know one's name, Kale. In 1438, Tanush (Major) Dukagjini was interned in Padua and is not mentioned again in the chronicles.

His little son, Lekë Dukagjini (born in 1420), did not play a great political role and is mentioned for the last time in 1451, as an enemy of Venice. His other son Pal Dukagjini (1411–1458) participated in the League of Lezhë and was an ally of Skanderbeg. On 21 October 1454, Alphonso V of Naples informed Skanderbeg that Pal Dukagjini sent his envoys and declared his loyalty and vassalage to the Kingdom of Naples. Based on that, Alphonso V awarded Pal Dukagjini with 300 ducats of annual provisions.

Pal had four sons, Lekë, Nikollë, Progon, and Gjergj Dukagjini.

The name of Gjergj Dukagjini is mentioned only once in historical sources, while his brother Progon died before 1471. The other two brothers, Lekë and Nikollë Dukagjini, left the country after the capture of Shkodër in 1479, going to Italy. They returned in 1481, trying to recapture their former territories from the Ottomans. One of their sons, Progon Dukagjini tried to do the same in 1501, but with little success.

After the Dukagjini family left the League of Lezhë in 1450, together with Arianiti family, they concluded a peace with Ottoman Empire and started their actions against Skanderbeg.

Some of the Dukagjinis seems to have fled to Venice along with other Venetians when they evacuated Shkodër, and a Luca Ducagini Duca di Pulato e dell stato Ducagino is recorded in Venice in 1506.

Dukakinzade Ahmed Pasha (died March 1515) (Albanian: Ahmed Pasha Dukagjini), another descendant of the family, was an Albanian Ottoman statesman. He was grand vizier of the Ottoman Empire from 1512 to 1515. His son, Dukakinzade Mehmed Pasha (Turkish: Dukakinoğlu Mehmed Paşa), was the governor of the Egypt Eyalet from 1544 to 1546, until he was executed.

== Possessions ==
=== Pal and Nicholas' possessions ===
Pal Dukagjini and his kinsman Nicholas Dukagjini were initially subjects of Lekë Zaharia, a Venetian vassal who had possessions around Shkodër. Nicholas murdered Lekë, and the Dukagjini continued to rule over their villages Buba, Salita, Gurichuchi, Baschina under Venetian vassalage. Pal and Nicholas were part of the League of Lezhë, a military alliance forged in 1444 that sought to capture Albania from the Ottoman Empire, led by Skanderbeg. In 1450, they abandoned Skanderbeg's army and allied with the Ottomans against Skanderbeg.

== Armorials ==
=== Main branch ===
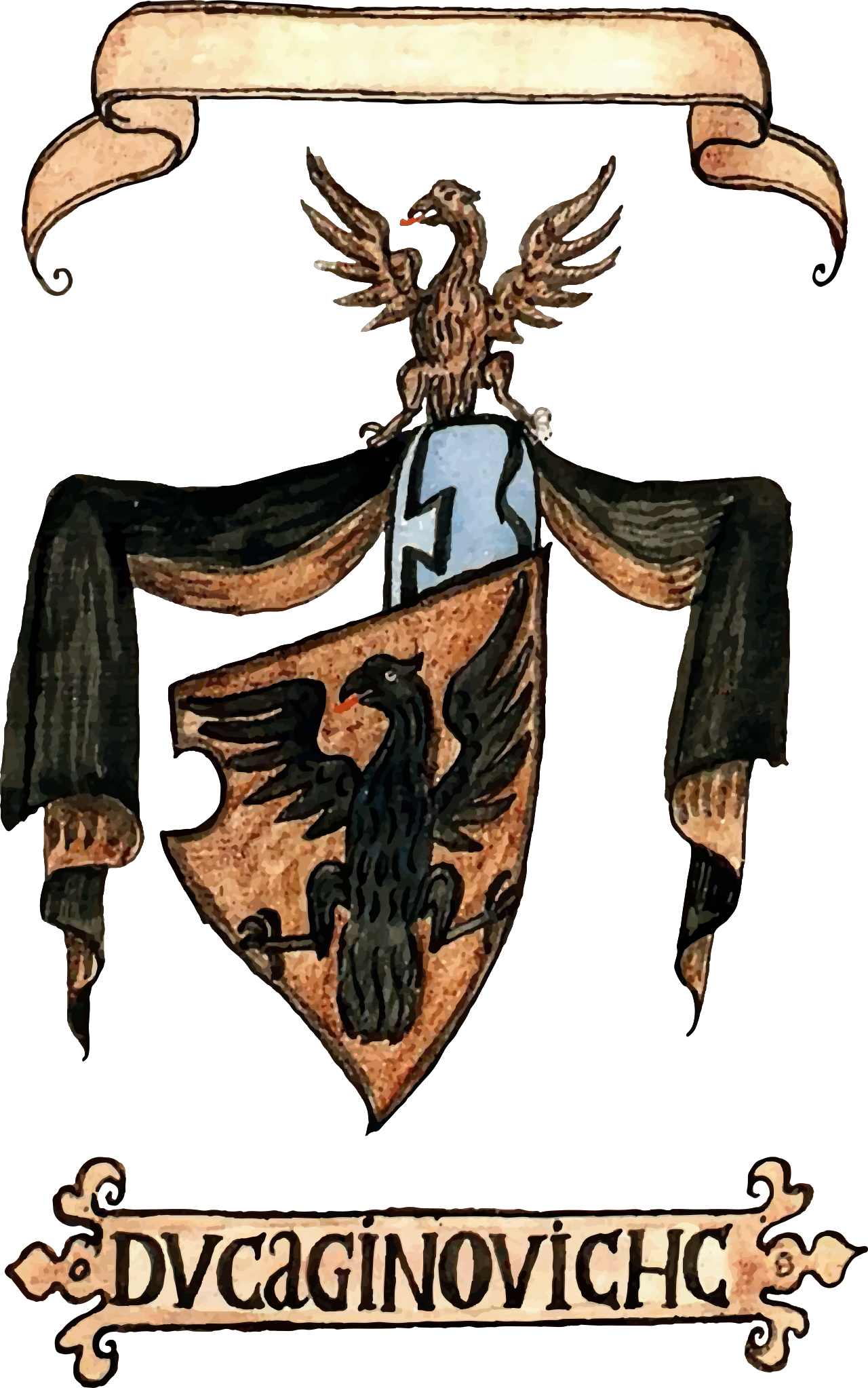
17th-century coat of arms of the Dukagjini family from the Fojnica Armorial

Coat of arms of the Dukagjini family from a marble carving found in the residence of Demetrio Lecca who was one of the last family heirs

Recreation of the Dukagjini coat of arms

=== Cadet branches ===
Coat of arms of the Istria branch of the Dukagjini family

== See also ==
- Albanian principalities
- History of Albania
