= Peter Spani (League of Lezhë) =

15th-century Albanian noble

- Noble family: Spani
- Issue: Lucia Spani
- Father: Marin Spani

Peter Spani (Albanian: Pjetër Shpani; fl. 1430–1457) was an Albanian nobleman and Venetian pronoetes in the first half of the 15th century. His family's domains included territories around Shkodër (Scutari), Drisht (Drivasto) and western Kosovo. He ruled over Shala, Shosh, Nikaj-Mërtur (Lekbibaj) and Pult; the whole region under the Ottomans took his name, Petrişpan-ili (literally, 'dominions of Pjetër Shpani'). Between 1444 and 1455, Peter was a member of the League of Lezhë; after his death, the League took his territories.

== Family ==
The Spani family appears for the first time in Shkodër, c. 1322. They were involved in trade in the city and gradually became a major landowning family. Peter Spani appears in 1401 in archival documents as one of the pro-Venetian notables in the medieval city of Drivasto. The Spani seem to have been involved in a dispute with the Jonima family who during the time the Balšić family controlled it acquired lands which previously belonged to the Spani. Nevertheless, when Peter Spani petitioned Venice, which in the meantime had taken control of Drisht, to regrant him lands which - according to him - had been usurped by Stefan Jonima, the Venetian administration refused to get involved. The feud between Spani and Jonima continue for many years. In 1415, Spani provided evidence that Stefan Jonima had collaborated with "enemies of Venice" in the region and the Venetian Senate decided finally to returns the lands which Spani requested back to him.

Peter's father, Marin, is first mentioned in 1409 as already deceased. And since Peter did not have any sons, he emphasized that his successor would be his nephew Marin, a son of his brother Brajko. Peter's other brother, Stefan, was appointed by the Venetians as the lord of village Podgora in 1406.

== League of Lezhë ==
In March 1444, Peter Spani attended a meeting of several Albania noblemen and chieftains in Lezhë when they allied themselves into a League of Lezhë, a military alliance united against the Ottomans. The League of Lezhë was founded by:

- Lekë Zaharia (lord of Sati and Dagnum) and his vassals Pal Dukagjin and Nicholas Dukagjini
- Peter Spani (lord of the mountains behind Drivasto)
- Lekë Dushmani (lord of Pult)
- George Strez Balšić with John and Gojko Balšić
- Andrea Thopia with his nephew Tanush Thopia
- Gjergj Arianiti
- Theodor Corona Musachi
- Stefan Crnojević with his sons

In 1451 after Alfonso signed the Treaty of Gaeta with Skanderbeg, he signed similar treaties with Peter Spani and other chieftains from Albania: Gjergj Arianiti, Ghin Musachi, George Strez Balšić, Pal III Dukagjini, Thopia Musachi, Peter of Himara, Simon Zenebishi and Carlo II Tocco. Gjon Muzaka's Brief chronicle on the descendants of our Musachi dynasty (1515) mentions that he survived the war and lived to an advanced age. In the early Ottoman-era subdivisions of Albania, the region formerly ruled by Pjetër Spani was known in Ottoman Turkish as Petrishpani or Ishpani. From 1430 to 1456, the Spani are also often mentioned in the archives of the Republic of Ragusa.
