= Tanush Thopia =

Albanian nobleman

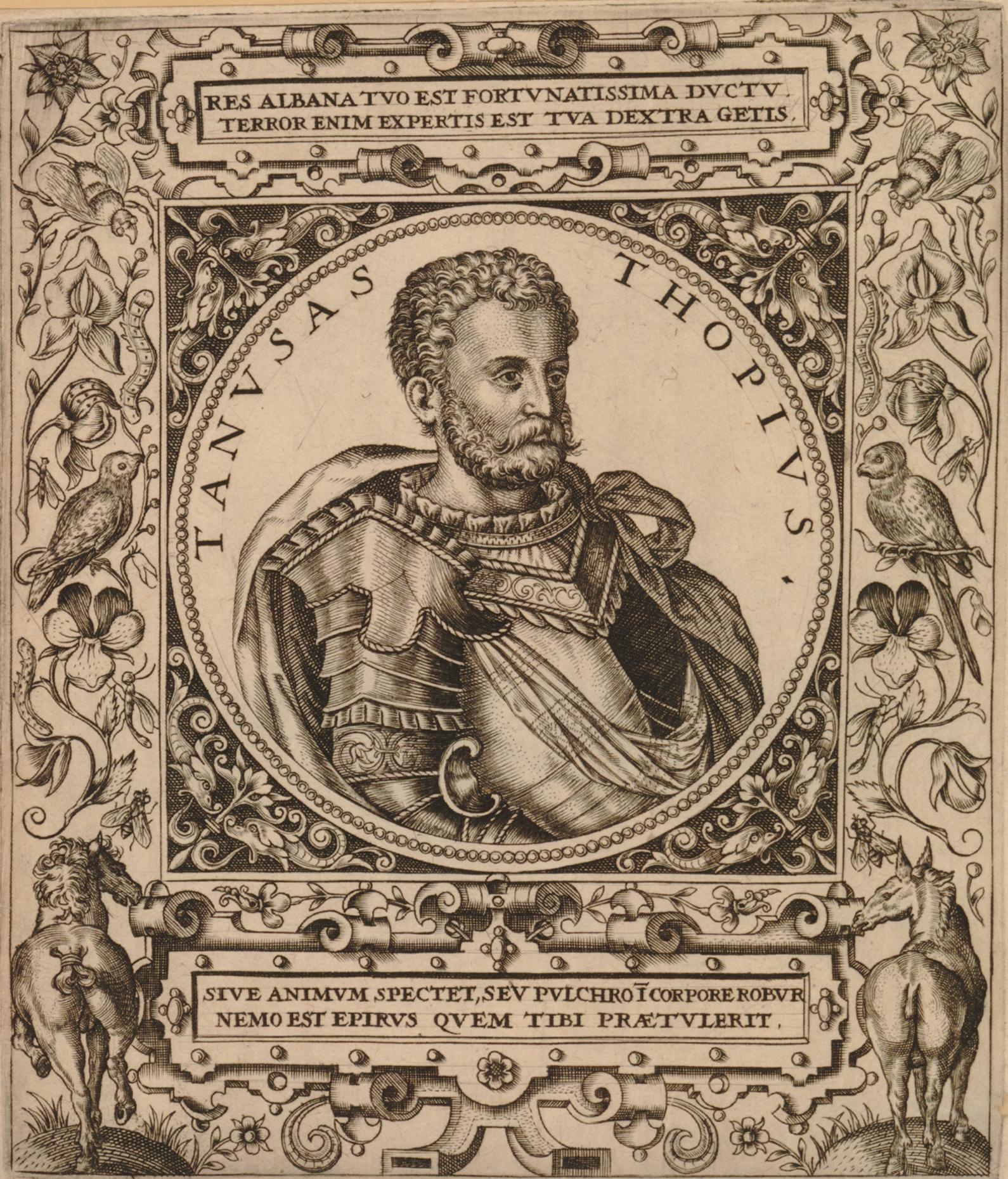
- 1596 engraving by Johann Theodor de Bry of Tanush Thopia
- Died: 1467; Krujë, League of Lezhë (modern Albania)
- Noble family: Thopia family
- Occupation: Military commander

Tanush Thopia or Tanusio Thopia (Albanian: Tanush Topia, Latin: Tanusas Thopius; d. 1467) was an Albanian nobleman and one of the closest collaborators of Gjergj Kastrioti Skanderbeg.

== Life ==
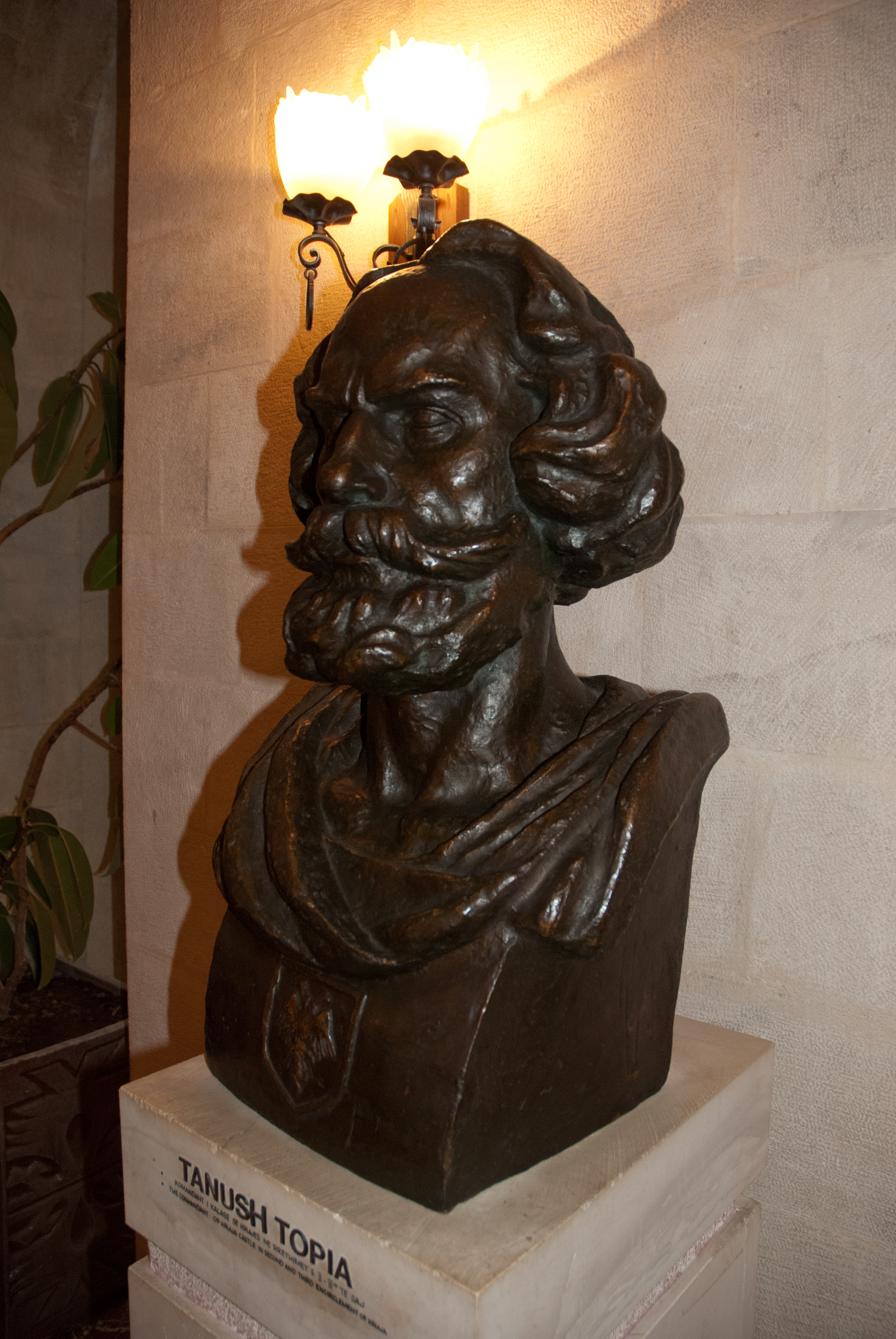
Modern bust of Tanush found in the Castle of Krujë

Tanush Thopia descended from the Thopia family that converted from Orthodox Christianity to Catholicism.

In 1444, together with his uncle Andrea Thopia, he participated in the founding of the League of Lezhë, the military alliance led by Skanderbeg. He was a commander of the infantry of the League of Lezhë, and his garrison became famous for their resistance during the Second Siege of Krujë. After that siege he is no longer mentioned in historical sources, and some suppose that he might have been killed in the end of that battle or died soon afterwards. He was a skillful commander and his loyalty to Skanderbeg was undeterred and that was the reason why he was appointed in that delicate position.

The name Tanush is an Albanian exonym for Athanassius.

== See also ==
- Thopia family
- Principality of Albania (medieval)
- Saint Gjon Vladimir's Church
