= Pult =

Region in northern Albania

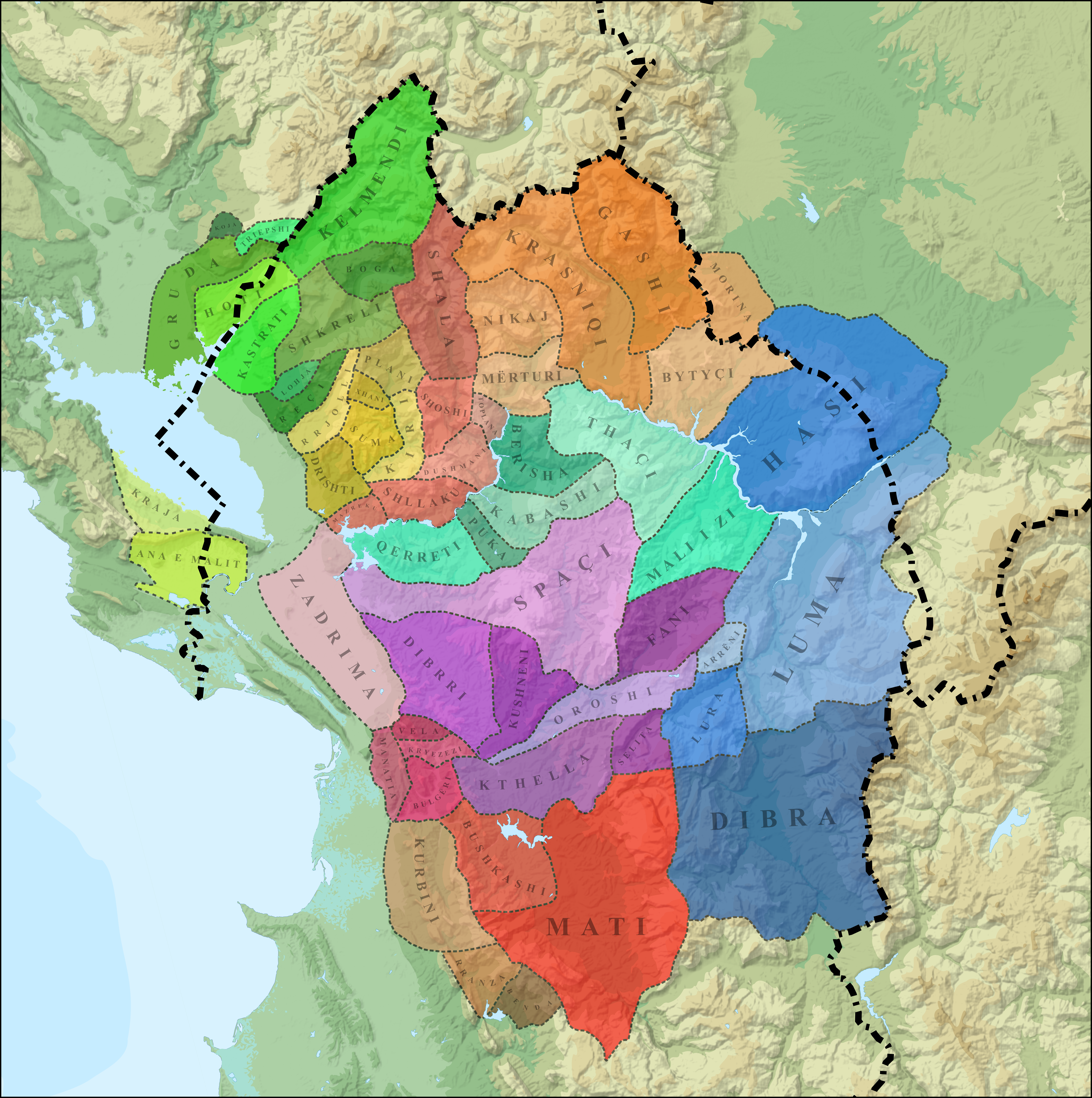
Pult region in shades of yellow, in northern Albania.

Pult or Pulat (Albanian definite form: Pulti or Pulati), is a region in northern Albania. It is bordered by the Malësia e Madhe Region to its north and by the Dukagjin Highlands to its east and its south. The region has traditionally been inhabited by the Plani, Kiri, Suma, Xhani, Drishti and Rrjolli tribes. The Pult region is situated on the Kir river and extends beyond Drisht to Prekal.

== Name ==
The name has evolved with accordance with the evolution of the phonetic system of Albanian from the ancient name Pólatum.

== History ==
Stefan Nemanja (1166–1196) conquered Pult around 1185, after the capture of Zeta. The area is mentioned in the Charter of Hilandar, noting that Pult was inhabited by Albanians. The Russian diplomat and historian Ivan Yastrebov designated Pult as part of the Dukagjin region.

In 1332, two Albanian-inhabited towns were recorded in the Pult region; Polatum Maius ("Greater Pult") and Polatum Minus ("Lesser Pult"). The Dukagjini family ruled the region during the Middle Ages, and Pult was therefore part of the Principality of Dukagjini. At one point during the 16th–17th centuries, Pjetër Spani of the Spani family was the Lord of Pult. In the early 17th century, there was a catholic church dedicated to Saint Barbara in Upper Pult.

== See also ==
- Pult, village in Albania
- Diocese of Pulati
