= Reposh Kastrioti =

15th century Albanian nobleman and orthodox monk

- Dux of Illyria; Prince of Kastrioti
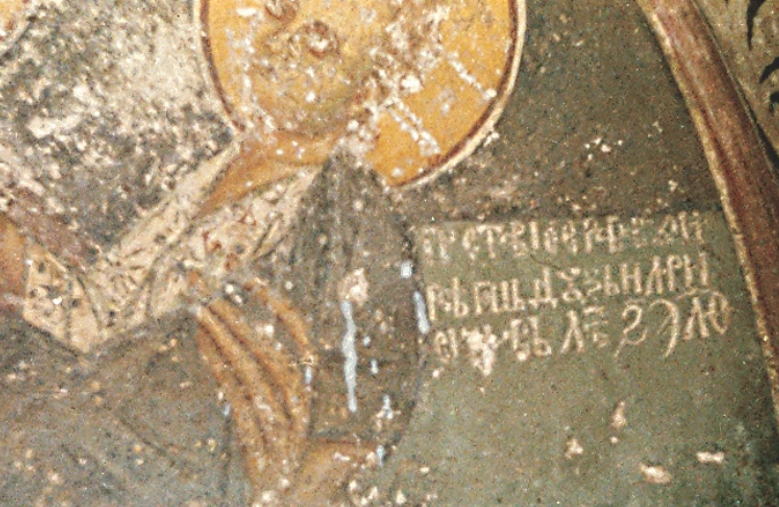
- Fresco of Reposh Kastrioti found in Hilandar monastery with an inscription bearing his name.

Prince of Kastrioti
- Predecessor: Gjon Kastrioti
- Successor: Post Abolished.
- Died: († 1430 or 1431); Albanian Tower, Hilandar, Mount Athos
- Burial: Stefan Milutin’s narthex, Hilandar.
- Issue: Unknown issue, possibly father of Constantine Kastrioti
- Dynasty: House of Kastrioti
- Father: Gjon Kastrioti
- Mother: Voisava Kastrioti
- Religion: Eastern Orthodoxy
- Occupation: Monk

Reposh Kastrioti was an Albanian nobleman and a monk at the Hilandar monastery on Mount Athos. His father was Gjon Kastrioti, a nobleman who ruled over the Principality of Kastrioti and his mother was Voisava Kastrioti. Reposh’s brother, Skanderbeg is the national hero of Albania.

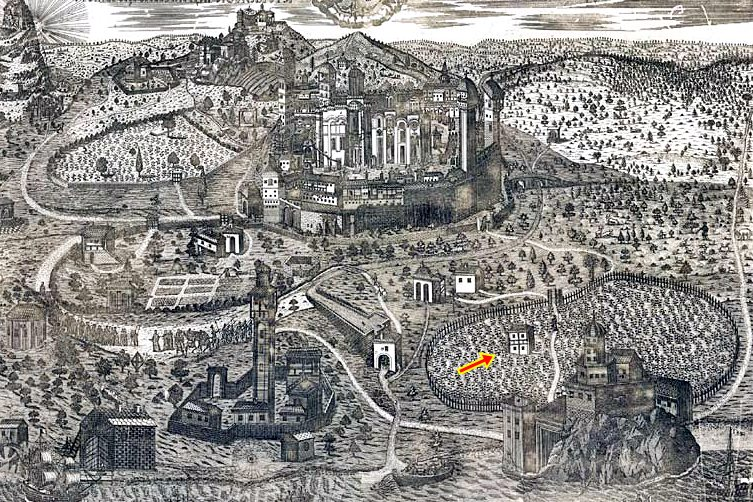
Copper woodcut of Hilandar with an arrow pointing at the Albanian Tower where Reposh and his family were adelphates.

== Monastic life ==
In the year of 1426 the Albanian Lord Gjon Kastrioti either donated the villages of Radostusha and Trebisht, or the rights to the tax revenues from these villages, as well as possibly donating the Church of Saint Mary, located in one of them, or its associated income to Hilandar Monastery. Between 1426 and 1431, Gjon Kastrioti and his sons, Reposh, Kostandin, and Gjergj with the exception of Stanisha, acquired four adelphates for 60 fiorints. They were granted the right to reside on monastic land and receive subsidies from monastic resources, including ownership of the Albanian Tower and additional properties within the monastery.

An inscription at Hilandar, referencing Reposh's death in 1431, suggests that he, and possibly his father Gjon, utilised their adelphates to retire to the tower, where Reposh ultimately spent his final days as a monk.

The Albanian noble Gjon Muzaka in his 16th-century chronicle describes Reposh as a “religious man” who journeyed to Mount Sinai.

== Death and legacy ==
Reposh retired as a monk on the monastery where he spent his final days there before he died. In Serbian King Stefan Milutin’s narthex besides the north wall is an inscription that refer’s to Reposh as “Duksi Illirski” in Serbian meaning “Illyrian Duke”. Next to the narthex, remains the grave of Reposh who died there in 1431.

== See also ==
- House of Kastrioti
- Albanian Tower
