= Albanian Tower =

Tower in Hilandar Monastery, Mount Athos, Greece

- Kulla Shqiptare; Arbanaski pirg
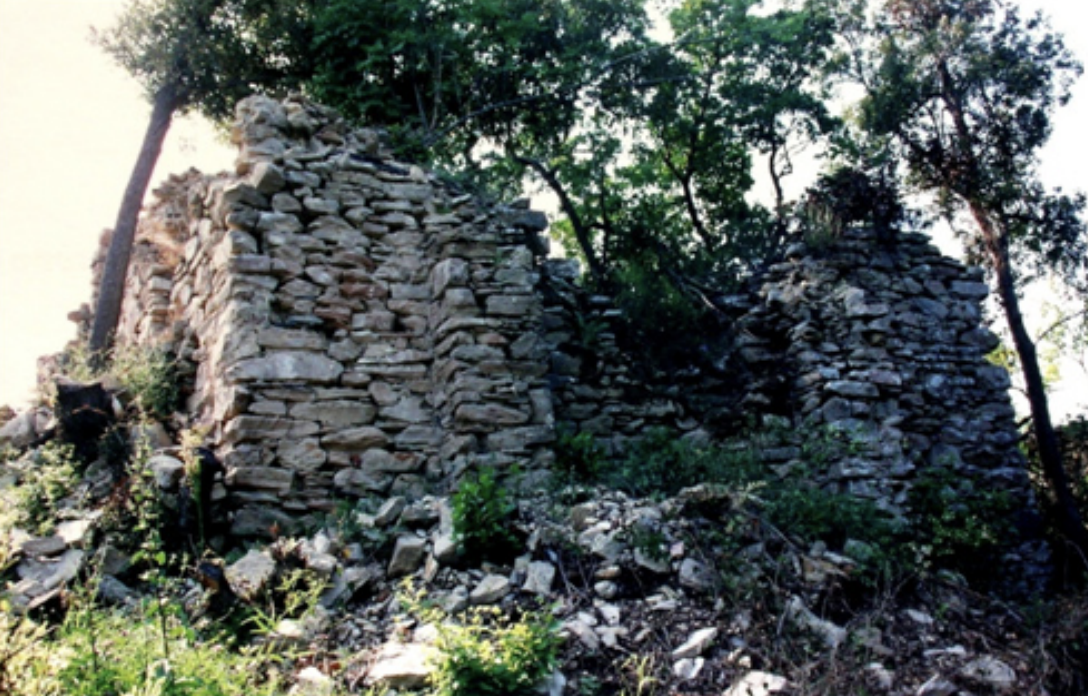
- The Albanian Tower (eastern portion)
- Interactive map of the Albanian Tower area

General information
- Status: Ruins
- Location: Mount Athos, Greece
- Coordinates: 40°19′54.09″N 24°7′47.64″E
- Owner: Hilandar Monastery; Gjon Kastrioti (Previously)

Technical details
- Material: Stone

The Albanian Tower (Albanian: Kulla Shqiptare), also known as Arbanaski pirg or Saint George Tower, is a historic structure located within the Hilandar Monastery on Mount Athos.

== History ==
The tower is thought to have originally been dedicated to Saint George. (Note: "...one of the monastery's towers as the tower of the Albanians (Arbanaski pirg). The initial view of the scholarly community was that this tower, being dedicated to St. George...") This tower, located outside the monastery walls, remains partially preserved today, with ruins reaching up to four or five meters in height, along with sections of the surrounding wall.

In the year of 1426 the Albanian Lord Gjon Kastrioti either donated the villages of Radostusha and Trebisht, or the rights to the tax revenues from these villages, as well as possibly donating the Church of Saint Mary, located in one of them, or its associated income to Hilandar Monastery. (Note: "Заједно са синовима Константином, Репошем и Ђурђем приложио је Иван Кастриот манастиру Хиландару село Радосуше са црквом св. Богородице и село Требиште....Због тога је и пирг св. Ђорђа прозван »арбанашки пирг». Репош је умро у манастиру Хиландару 25. јула 1431. године и ту је сахрањен. (Together with his sons Konstantin, Repoš and Đurađ, Ivan Kastriot donated village Radosuše with church of saint Mary and village Trebište to the monastery Hilandar... Therefore the tower of Saint George was named 'Albanian Tower'. Repoš died in Hilandar on 25 July 1431 and he was buried there.") Between 1426 and 1431, Gjon Kastrioti and his sons, Reposh, Kostandin, and Gjergj with the exception of Stanisha, acquired four adelphates for 60 fiorints. They were granted the right to reside on monastic land and receive subsidies from monastic resources, including ownership of the Albanian Tower and additional properties within the monastery. In Gjon's honor, the Saint George Tower at the Hilandar Monastery became known as the Albanian Tower (Arbanaski pirg). (Note: "...which, as a result, became known as the Albanian tower...") It is possible that Gjon Kastrioti played a role in the construction of the tower. (Note: "...his father had built the so-called Albanian tower in the Chilandar monastery on Mount Athos...")

An inscription at Hilandar, referencing Reposh's death in 1431, suggests that he, and possibly his father Gjon, utilised their adelphates to retire to the tower, where Reposh ultimately spent his final days as a monk. (Note: "...His son Reposh died at Hilandar as an Orthodox monk...")

According to documents preserved in the Hilandar archives, the Moldavian ruler Stephen the Great and his wife, Maria Voichița, also made donations to the tower. Historians have interpreted this patronage as a honorific of Maria Voichița's maternal Albanian heritage, inherited through her mother, Maria Despina.

== Gallery ==
Images of the Albanian Tower
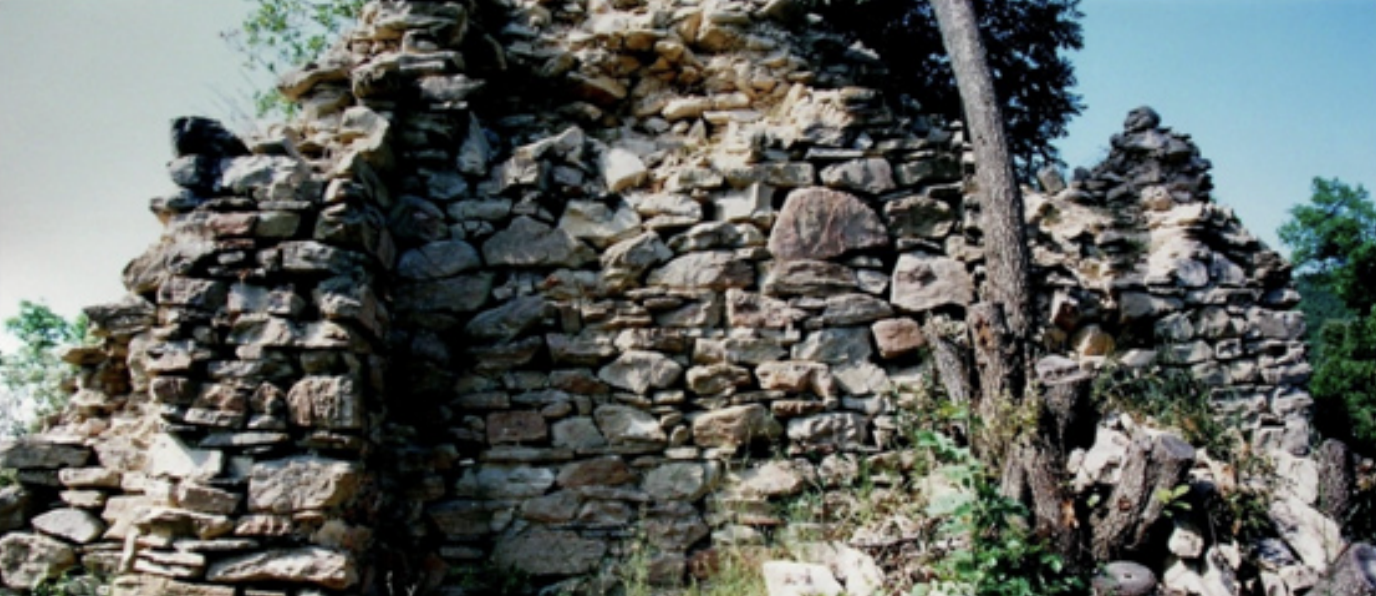
Image of the Albanian Tower from the south

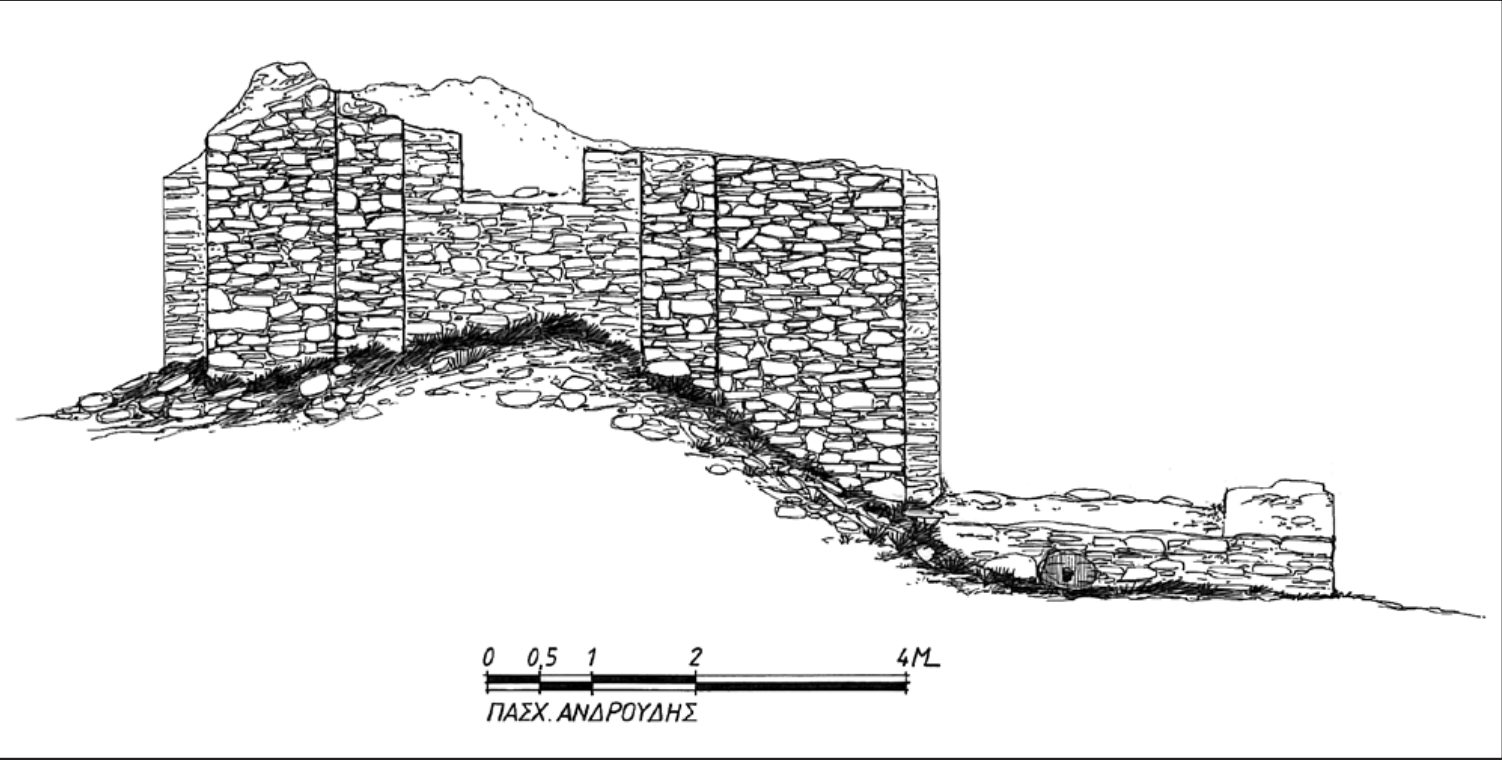
East elevation diagram of the Albanian Tower

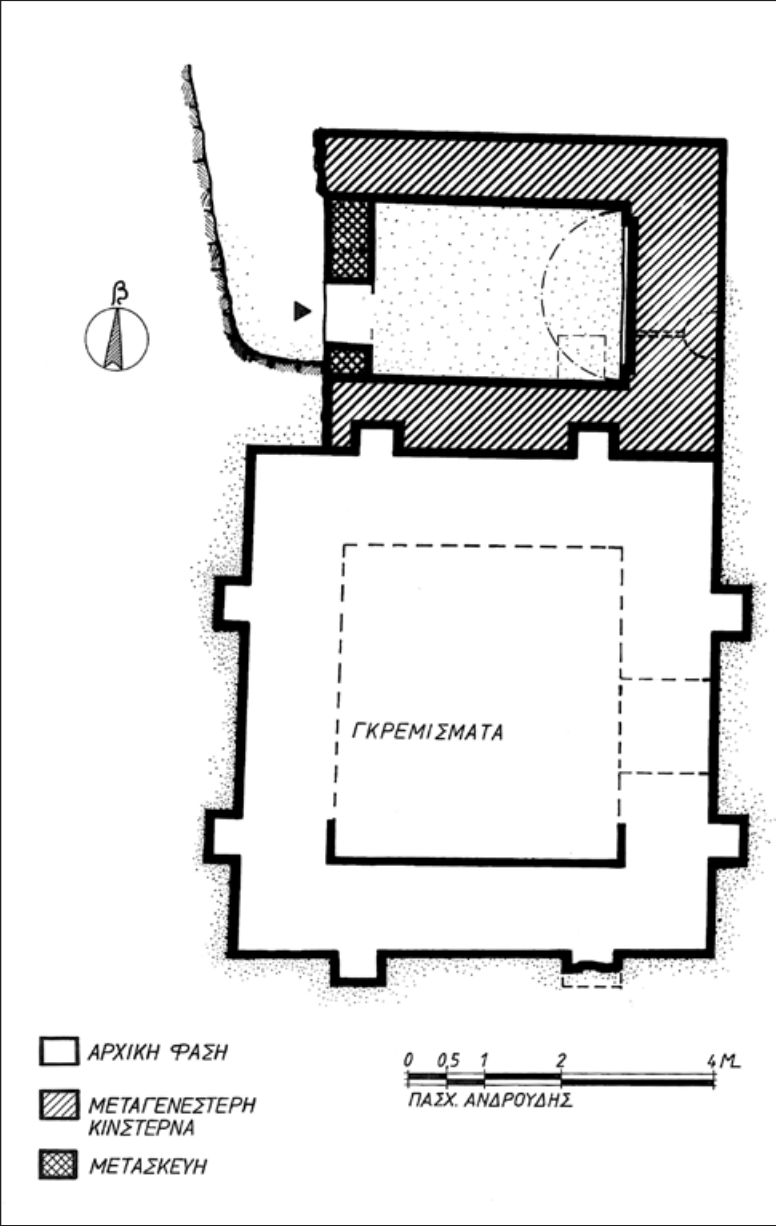
Plan of the Albanian Tower from above

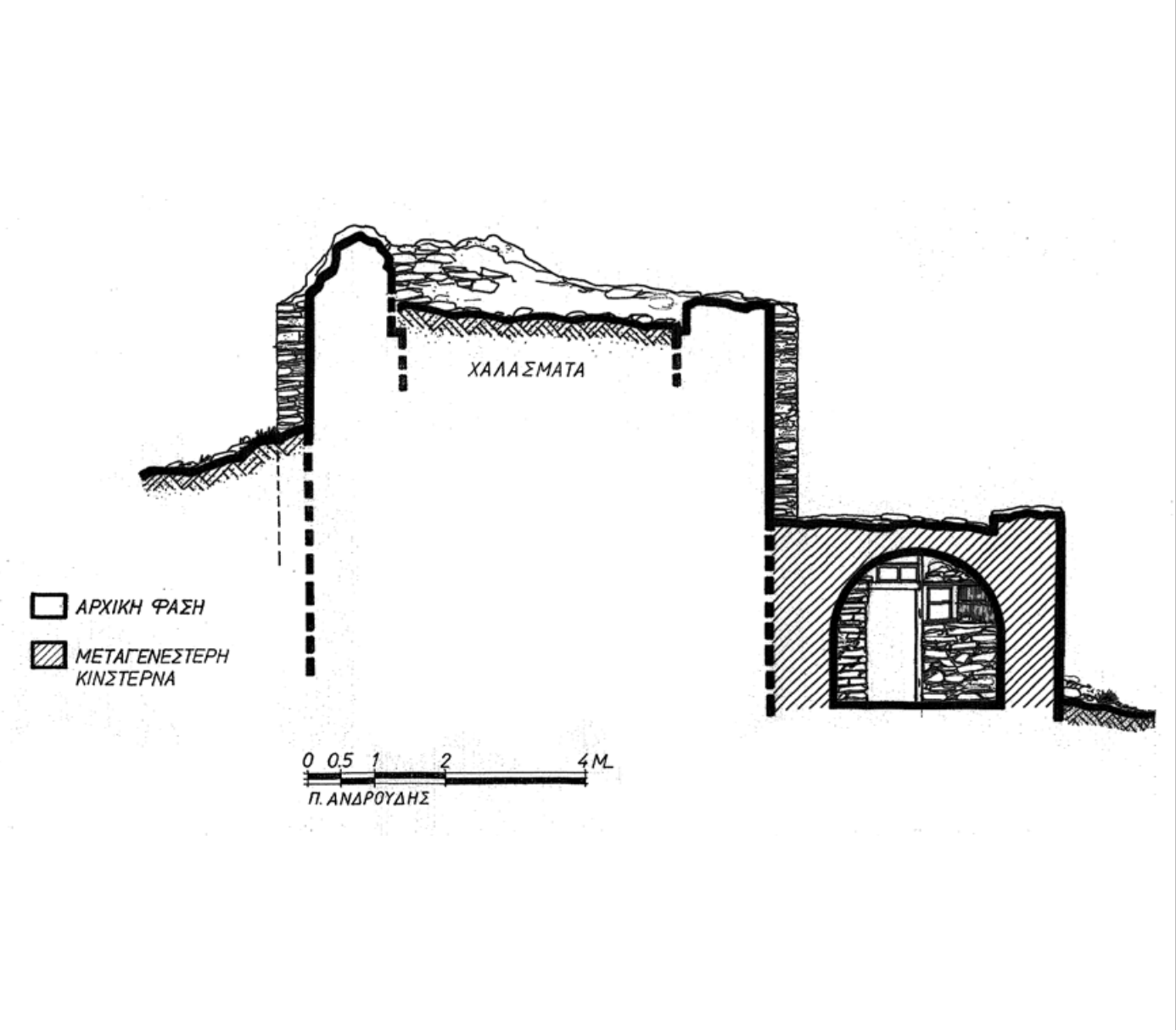
Plan of the Albanian Tower from the front

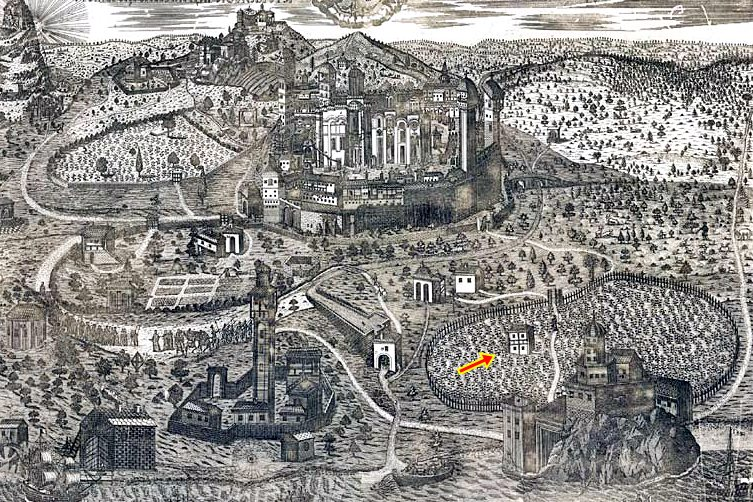
Copper engraving of Hilandar Monastery in 1757. (arrow pointed at the Albanian tower)

== See also ==
- House of Kastrioti
