= Stanisha Kastrioti =

Albanian nobleman

Stanisha Kastrioti (Albanian: Stanish; Latin: Stanissa; fl. 1421–45) was an Albanian nobleman, a member of the Kastrioti family, father of Hamza Kastrioti and older brother of Skanderbeg.

== Life ==
His father Gjon Kastrioti was an Albanian lord who had possessions in the Mat region. His mother was Voisava, who was likely a Serbian noblewoman. It is unknown when Stanisha and his brothers were born, while his younger brother Skanderbeg is taken to have been born in 1405. He also had brothers Reposh and Kostandin, and five sisters, Mara, Jelena, Angelina, Vlajka and Mamica. His father became an Ottoman vassal at the end of the 14th century, and as such, paid tribute and provided military services (like in the Battle of Ankara in 1402). In 1409, one of the brothers, believed by Anamali and Frashëri to have been Stanisha, was sent to the Ottoman court as a hostage, to ensure loyalty of Gjon Kastrioti as an Ottoman vassal to the sultan. Gjon accepted the suzerainty of the Republic of Venice in 1413, but was again in Ottoman vassalage by 1415. In the 1419–26 period Gjon was an ally of Serbian Despot Stefan Lazarević, who was also an Ottoman vassal, and had informed the Republic of Venice during the Second Scutari War (1419–23) between Venice and Serbia that he was compelled to give his son as a hostage to Despot Stefan. According to Fan Noli it was Stanisha who was sent by his father, together with auxiliary forces, to help the Serbians against the Venetians at Scutari.

Gjon issued a charter in Old Serbian to the Serbian Orthodox Hilandar monastery on Mount Athos in 1425–26, in which he donated the two villages of Radostuša (which included a church) and Trebište to the Hilandar, and mentioned his four sons by name. In a charter issued by Hilandar between 1426 and 1431, the monastery granted the temporary purchase by Gjon and his sons, except Stanisha, to four adelphates (rights to reside on monastic territory and receive subsidies from monastic resources) of the Albanian Tower. Scholars have noticed that Stanisha was not mentioned in this second charter, and considered that he was Turkified immediately after 1426, likely around 1428. That claim is however not supported by documents. It was also believed that he "disappeared", however, it was found that he was mentioned as the son of deceased Gjon Kastrioti in a Venetian document dated 12 February 1445. That document does not bring any conclusion as to the possible Turkification of Stanisha. The Venetian government confirmed the earlier duties held by the father of Skanderbeg and Stanisha, and promised them Venetian citizenship and shelter if they were to be expelled from their lands.

== Sources ==
- Anamali, Skënder (2002). Historia e popullit shqiptar në katër vëllime (in Albanian). Vol. I. Botimet Toena. OCLC 52411919.
- Bartl, Peter (2001) [1995]. Albanci: od srednjeg veka do danas (in Serbian). Translated by Milenković, Ljubinka. Belgrade: Clio. ISBN 978-86-7102-017-6. OCLC 51036121.
- Fine, John Van Antwerp Jr. (1994) [1987]. The Late Medieval Balkans: A Critical Survey from the Late Twelfth Century to the Ottoman Conquest. University of Michigan Press. ISBN 978-0-472-08260-5.
- Frashëri, Kristo (2002). Gjergj Kastrioti Skënderbeu: jeta dhe vepra, 1405–1468 (in Albanian). Botimet Toena. ISBN 99927-1-627-4.
- Noli, Fan S. (1947). George Castrioti Scanderbeg (1405–1468). International Universities Press. OCLC 732882.
- Petrovski, Boban (2006). "Воисава Трибалда" [Voisava Tribalda] (PDF) (in Macedonian). Skopje.
- Redakcija za istoriju Crne Gore (1970b). Историја Црне Горе (2): Црна Гора у доба обласних господара. Titograd: Redakcija za istoriju Crne Gore. p. 214. OCLC 492555897.
- Schmitt, Oliver Jens (2009). Skanderbeg: Der neue Alexander auf dem Balkan (in German). Regensburg: Verlag Friedrich Pustet. OCLC 441151026.
- Sindik, Dušan (1991). "Две повеље у Хиландару о Ивану Кастриоту и синовима". Становништво словенског поријекла у Албанији: Зборник радова са међународног научног скупа одржаног на Цетињу 21, 22. и 23. јуна 1990. године. Titograd: Историјски институт СР Црне Горе.
