= Gjon Kastrioti =

14th-15th century Albanian nobleman

- Lord in Albania; Lord of the part of Albania
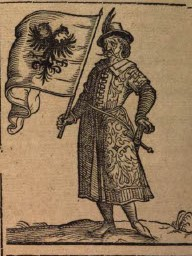
- Posthumous engraving of Gjon Kastrioti from 1533

Lord of Mat
- Reign: 1385–1437
- Predecessor: Pal Kastrioti
- Successor: Skanderbeg
- Born: northern Albania
- Died: before July 7, 1439
- Buried: Albanian Tower, Hilandar Monastery, Mount Athos
- Noble family: Kastrioti
- Spouse: Voisava Kastrioti (m. 1390)
- Issue: Reposh Kastrioti; Stanisha Kastrioti; Kostandin Kastrioti; Mara Kastrioti; Gjergj Kastrioti; Jelena Kastrioti; Mamica Kastrioti; Angelina Kastrioti; Vlajka Kastrioti
- Father: Pal Kastrioti
- Occupation: 1385–1407: Ottoman vassal 1407–1410: Venetian ally 1415–1417: Ottoman vassal 1419–1426: ally of Despot Stefan until 1437: Ottoman vassal

Gjon Kastrioti was an Albanian feudal lord from the House of Kastrioti which he led until his death in 1439, and the father of Albanian leader and national hero Gjergj Kastrioti (better known as Skanderbeg). He governed the territory between the Cape of Rodon and Dibër and had at his disposal an army of 2,000 horsemen.

== Life ==
=== Ancestry and early life ===
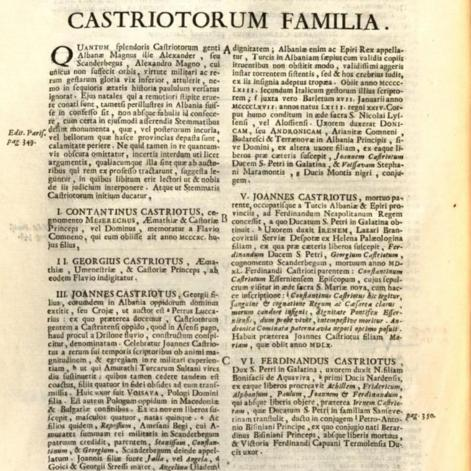
Genealogy of the Kastrioti family, Du Cange (1680), Historia Byzantina duplici commentario

The Kastrioti family was from a region of northern Albania between Mat, Dibër and Has. Konstantin Kastrioti Mazreku is attested in Giovanni Andrea Angelo Flavio Comneno's Genealogia diversarum principum familiarum. Angelo mentions Kastrioti as Constantinus Castriotus, cognomento Meserechus, Aemathiae & Castoriae Princeps (Constantinus Castriotus, surnamed Meserechus, Prince of Aemathia and Castoria). Angelo used the cognomen Meserechus in reference to Skanderbeg, and this link to the same name is produced in other sources and reproduced in later ones like Du Cange's Historia Byzantina (1680). These links highlight that the Kastrioti used Mazreku as a name that highlighted their tribal affiliation (farefisni). The name Mazrek(u), which means "horse breeder" in Albanian, is found throughout all Albanian regions. Gjon Kastrioti was the son of Pal/Gjergj Kastrioti. He appears in two historical sources, Gjon Muzaka's Breve memoria de li discendenti de nostra casa Musachi (1510) and Angelo's Genealogia diversarum principum familiarum (1603/1610), which was later largely reproduced by Du Cange (1680). Angelo calls Gjon Kastrioti's father "Georgius Castriotus" (Gjergj), lord (princeps) of "Aemathiae, Umenestria" (Mat and probably Ujëmisht) and "Castoriae". This toponym has been interpreted as Kastriot, Kastrat in Has, Kastrat in Dibra, or the microtoponym "Kostur" near the village of Mazrek in the Has region. Muzaka calls him "Paulo Castrioto" (Pal) and asserts that "he ruled over no more than two villages, called Signa and Gardi Ipostesi" (Sinë and Gardhi i Poshtëm, in Çidhën of Dibër). His rule over "only two villages" as described by Muzaka has been disputed because, if true, it would mean that his son, Gjon Kastrioti, who ruled over a much larger area, rose to power in the span of one generation. This is considered a very unlikely trajectory in the context of Albanian medieval society because noble families had acquired their area of influence over multiple generations in a complex system of affiliation with local village communities and intermarriage with each other. Historian Kristo Frashëri considers it likely that he ruled over his region "in the third quartier of the 14th century" between 1350–75, based on the fact that when his grandson Gjergj Kastrioti was born, his son Gjon had already fathered seven children with Voisava, daughter of a minor lord from the Polog Valley. The Kastrioti appear in archival records for the first time in the period of Gjon Kastrioti at the end of the 14th and the beginning of the 15th century.

Marin Barleti wrote that the Kastrioti lineage originated from a noble stock in Emathia (Mat).

=== Reign ===
Gjon Kastrioti rose as a feudal ruler in Albania at a time when its internal politics were being increasingly dominated by the Republic of Venice, which controlled many of its trade centers, and the Ottoman Empire, which in one form or another had begun to vassalize many of the small, independent lordships. Albanian feudal lords had to balance between the two Great Powers of their era and compete with each other. In 1402, Kastrioti, Koia Zaharia, Dhimitër Jonima, and other Albanian vassals of Ottoman Sultan Bayezid I personally led their retinues in the Battle of Ankara. The Ottoman defeat brought the retreat of the Ottomans from Albanian affairs, and families that took part in the battle of Ankara, like the Jonima and Zaharia, were weakened. The Balšić, which saw an opportunity to take Durrës from the Venetians, was defeated, and Konstantin Balšić was executed. In the power vacuum that formed, Kastrioti strengthened his position and sought to expand towards the coastal areas near the Venetian-controlled trading centers. He provided safe passage to merchants in the interior of the country and had no claims to Venetian-held territory. Venice saw their alliance as a counterweight to other local lords and the Ottomans.

Kastrioti accepted the suzerainty and was made a citizen of Venice in 1413, along with his heirs. Kastrioti maintained good relations with Venice after becoming an Ottoman vassal between 1415 and 1417 and was not likely to endanger those relations by seizing the Cape from Venice. The Venetians tried to bribe the Kastrioti and Dukagjini to fight against Zeta in 1419, but it seems without success.

Map of operations in 1421–1423 war between Serbian Despotate and Venice

In the period 1419–1426, Gjon was an ally of Serbian Despot Stefan Lazarević, who was also an Ottoman vassal. Lazarević had taken Zeta from Balša III in 1421, but the Venetians did not recognize him, holding on to the occupied Zetan coast and Buna, including Drivast. In August 1421, Lazarević led armies into Zeta and took Sveti Srdj, Drisht, and Bar; the Venetians concluded a truce and now held only the towns of Shkodër, Ulcinj, and Budva. When Lazarević demanded the surrender of these towns, Venice refused, and the war resumed. A number of Gjon Kastrioti's Albanians, led by one of his sons, joined Lazarević immediately upon the latter's arrival in Zeta. According to Fan Noli, it was Stanisha who was sent by his father, together with auxiliary forces, to help the Serbian despot capture Shkodër from Venetians. Lazarević besieged Shkodër, probably in June 1422, and for a year, it seemed that Venice would have lost their possessions; however, supported by some local Albanians, Venice managed to break the siege in December 1422. In January 1423, Venice bribed and won over the Pamaliots on Bojana and then bought over several tribal leaders in or near Zeta: the Paštrovići, Gjon Kastrioti (who had extended to the outskirts of Lezhë), the Dukagjins, and Koja Zaharia. Though none of these were mobilized militarily by Venice, they left the ranks of Lazarević's army and thus became a potential danger to Lazarević. Although Venetian admiral Francesco Bembo offered money to Kastrioti, Dukagjins, and Koia Zaharia in April 1423 to join the Venetian forces against the Serbian Despotate (offering 300 ducats to Gjon Kastrioti), they refused.

From time to time, one or more of Gjon's sons were sent as hostages to the Ottoman court. In 1428, Gjon Kastrioti had to seek forgiveness from the Venetian Senate because of Skanderbeg's participation in Ottoman military campaigns against the Christians.

=== War with the Ottomans ===
In an attempt to relieve Ottoman pressure during the Siege of Thessalonica, Venice inspired Gjon to rebel against the Ottomans in 1428. In August 1428, he sent his envoys, priest Dimitrije and lord Murat, to present to the Venetians the letters written by the sultan during the past five years (since the Venetians captured Thessalonica in 1423). In those letters, the sultan sent orders to Gjon to attack Venetian possessions in Albania. Since he refused to cooperate with the Ottomans, Gjon begged the Venetians to provide him with a safe conduct if the Ottomans attacked him. In April 1430, after the Ottomans captured Thessalonica, they captured most of Gjon's land. The Ottoman forces were led by Isak-Beg, who was a sanjakbey of the Sanjak of Skopje. He positioned Ottoman garrisons in two of Gjon's castles and destroyed the rest of them. Isak-Beg allowed Gjon to govern a very small part of the territory because the Ottomans held Gjon responsible only for disobedience, not for treason. Gjon Kastrioti joined an unsuccessful uprising against the Ottoman Empire led by Gjergj Arianiti between 1432 and 1436 and was again defeated by the Ottoman forces under Isak-Beg.

=== Death ===
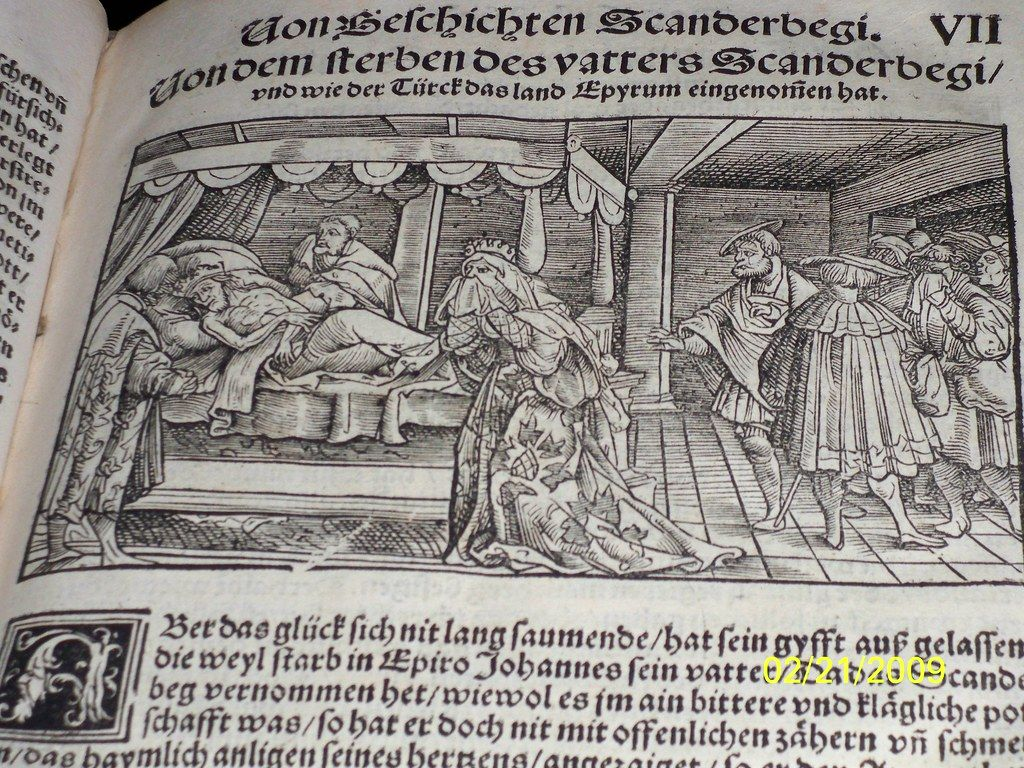
1575 depiction of the death of Gjon Kastrioti in a German translation of Marin Barleti’s Historia de vita et gestis Scanderbegi Epirotarvm principis.

While there is a mention that Gjon may have died in 1437; this is incorrect since he is mentioned as alive on March 28, 1438. Gjon probably died some time before 7 July 1439 (as he is mentioned as dead in this year). The territory previously controlled by Gjon Kastrioti was annexed by the Ottomans and listed in their registers as land of Yuvan-ili (Yuvan was Gjon's name in the Turkish language). Until 1438, a part of Gjon Kastrioti's estates, comprising nine villages, was awarded to Skanderbeg as his timar, and in May 1438, those nine villages were awarded to André Karlo. The granting of these villages to André Karlo must have upset Skanderbeg, who requested to be granted control over the zeamet in Misia, which consisted of his father's former domain. Sanjakbey (probably of the Sanjak of Ohrid) objected to Skanderbeg's request.

== Administration ==
Collecting the custom duties from Ragusan traders, exporting the grain, and trading with salt were important sources of income for Gjon Kastrioti.

The Venetian Republic attempted to introduce its own units of measure on marketplaces in Scutari, Durazo, and Alessio since the beginning of 1410. This intention caused confusion, which was a reason for Gjon Kastrioti to complain through his envoys in Venice. In January 1410, the Venetians accepted Gjon's demands to measure grain and other products exported by him the way they had previously been measured.

Based on the order of the despot of Serbia, when they would travel from Ragusa to Prizren, they had to use the route through Shkodër in Albania Veneta, and the Kastrioti's land instead of the previous route through the land under the control of the small feudal lords and highland tribes of Montenegro. With that letter, Gjon informed merchants from Dubrovnik that they were granted safe conduct when passing through regions under his control on their way from Shufada to Prizren. In March 1422, Gjon asked Venice to allow Ragusan traders to travel to his territory in Sufaday through Alessio instead of Scutari, which was allowed starting in August.

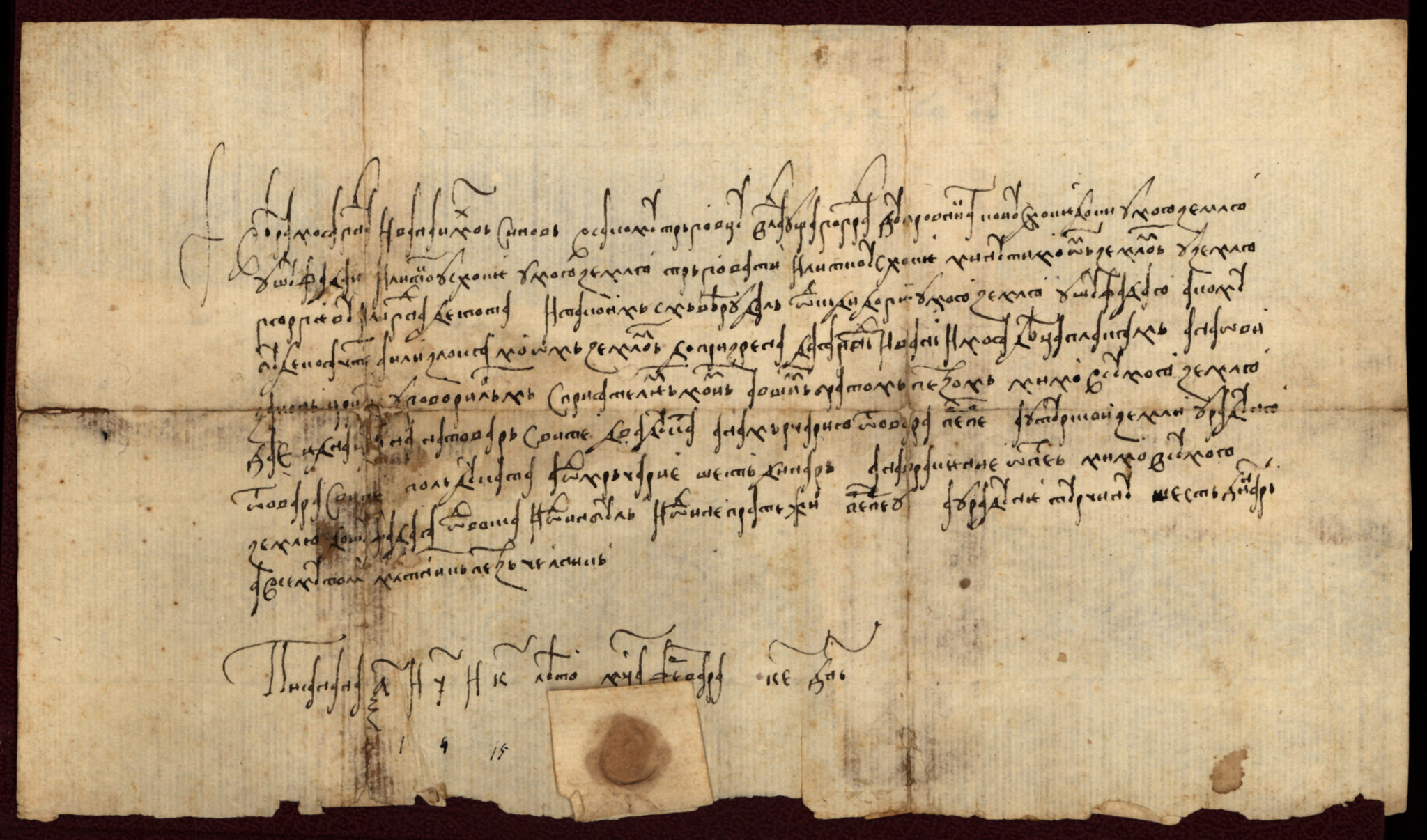
A letter issued by Gjon Kastrioti to the merchants of Dubrovnik. His coat of arms can be seen at the bottom of the document.

After the death of Balša in 1421, the Venetians promised to allow Kastrioti to collect the salt produced in Durrës. Because of the reduced production, Venice did not respect its promise. Gjon tried to avoid the monopoly of the Venetian Republic and built his own salt evaporation ponds. In 1424, the Venetians forced him to destroy all of them because they noticed some of their convoys directed to collect salt in Durrës never appeared there. At the beginning of the 15th century, Šufaday (an important former marketplace on the Adriatic Sea, near Lezhë) was a possession of the Jonima family, and in 1428 it was under Gjon's control. At that time, the region of Shufada was rich with forests, and the wood was transported through its port to Ragusa. On 17 August 1428, Gjon complained through his representatives in Venice because he was not allowed to collect salt in Durrës.

== Religion ==
His religion was directly influenced by the international balance of political powers. It is believed that a popular saying in southern Albania, "Where the sword is, there lies religion" (Albanian: Ku është shpata, është feja) has originated from Gjon Kastrioti. When he was an ally of Venice in 1407–1410, he was a Roman Catholic. After he allied himself with Stefan Lazarević, despot of the Serbian Despotate in the period 1419–1426, he converted to Eastern Orthodoxy, and in 1431 he was converted to Islam because he was a vassal of the Ottoman Empire.

In 1426, he donated the right to the proceeds from taxes collected from the two villages (Rostuša and Trebište in North Macedonia) and from the church of Saint Mary, which was in one of them, to the Serbian Orthodox monastery of Hilandar in Mount Athos, where his son Reposh retired and died on 25 July 1431. Afterwards, between 1426 and 1431, Kastrioti and his sons, with the exception of Stanisha, purchased four adelphates (rights to reside on monastic territory and receive subsidies from monastic resources) to the Saint George Tower and to some property within the monastery. In his honor, the Saint George Tower of the monastery of Hilandar was known as the Albanian Tower (Albanian: Kulla Shqiptare; Serbian: Арбанашки пирг, romanized: Arbanaški pirg). Because of his frequent changes of religion, it is unknown, but at the time of his death, he may have been a Roman Catholic or Sunni Muslim, because during the time of his death, the Principality of Kastrioti was under the rule of the Ottoman Empire.

== Titles ==
His different titles used in sources include Lord of Emathia and Vumenestia or simply Lord of Mat. In Venetian sources he was also referred to as "Lord in Albania" (Dominum in Albania), and "Lord of the part of Albania" (Dominus Partium Albanie).

== See also ==
- Skanderbeg
- House of Kastrioti
- Principality of Kastrioti

== Notes ==
In the Slavic archival sources of the time, Scanderbeg's father is variously called Ivan Castriothi, Ivanus Castrioti, Juano/Juanum Castrioti, Juannus Castrioti, Juanum, Johanni, Ivanus, Ivani, Iohannes, Janus, Iouan, Ioannis, Yuan, Ivan, Yuvan, etc. In the few acts of his own chancellery, his name results Ivan or Ivanъ; his Slavonic acts were probably written by Ninac Vukosalić. Besides the acts in Slavonic, Ivan is used by some Byzantine chroniclers, like Laonicus Chalcocondyles (Ὶβάνης) and many works written by the contemporary scholars. Contemporary Ottoman documents refer to him as Yuvan, to his lands as Yuvan-ili while his son George was referred to as Iskender Bey Yuvan Oglu. Giovanni Musachi (fl. 1510) in his work written in Italian, calls him Giovanni, which is also used by Demetrio Franco (1443–1525). Marin Barleti in his 1508–10 Latin work, calls him Iohannes. Frang Bardhi (1606–1643) in his Apology, dwelling on an Albanian named Gjon Kastrati, states that: "Gion, which in Latin is Iohannis".

== Sources ==
- Bela, Muhamet (2019). "A ishte Skënderbeu nga Hasi?! - Mendime rreth origjinës së Skënderbeut". In Syla, Sabit; Verli, Marenglen; Asani, Skënder; Berisha, Gjon (eds.). Gjergj Kastrioti - Skënderbeu në 550-vjetorin e vdekjes: (materiale nga Konferenca shkencore ndërkombëtare "Gjergj Kastrioti - Skënderbeu në 550-vjetorin e vdekjes", mbajtur në Prishtinë, më 16 tetor 2018) (PDF) (in Albanian). Institute of history "Ali Hadri". ISBN 978-9951409803.
- Malaj, Edmond (2013). "Familje fisnike të Drishtit mesjetar (Noble Families of Medieval Drivasto". Studime Historike. 3–4.
- Muhaj, Ardian (2015). "Hulumtimi i origjinës së Skënderbeut përmes historisë së jetës dhe veprës së tij". 610-vjetori i lindjes së Heroit Kombëtar Gjergj Kastrioti Skënderbeu. Academy of Sciences of Albania.
- Omari, Jeton (2014). Scanderbeg tra storia e storiografia [Skanderbeg between history and historiography] (PDF) (Thesis). University of Padua.
- İnalcık, Halil (1995). From empire to republic : essays on Ottoman and Turkish social history (in French). Istanbul: Isis Press. ISBN 978-975-428-080-7. OCLC 34985150.
- Fine, John Van Antwerp (1994). The Late Medieval Balkans: A Critical Survey from the Late Twelfth Century to the Ottoman Conquest. University of Michigan Press. ISBN 978-0-472-08260-5.
