= Petrelë Castle =

Albanian sixth-century castle

- Kalaja e Petrelës
- Petrelë, Albania
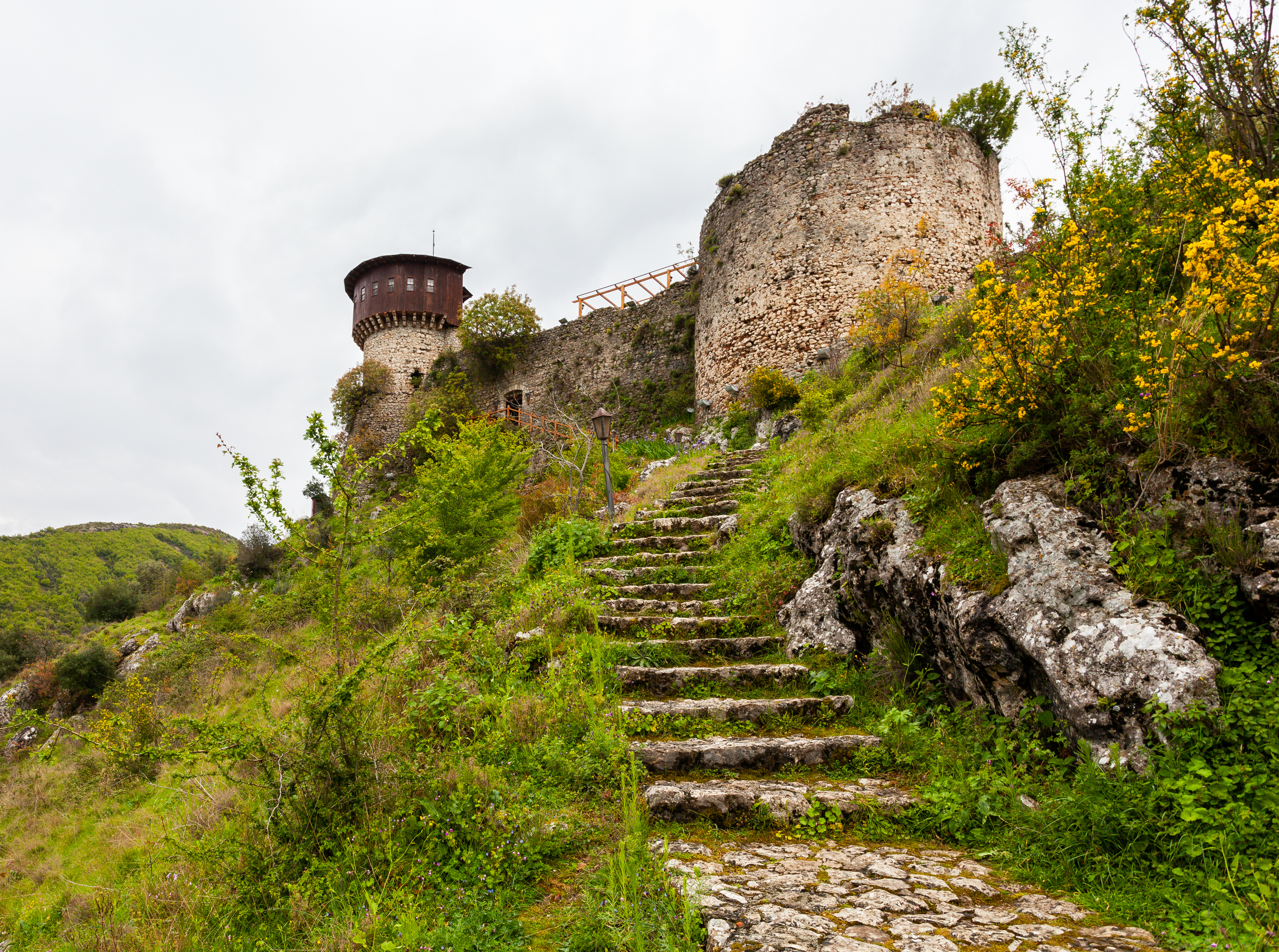
- Petrelë Castle

Site information
- Type: Castle
- Controlled by: Byzantine Empire; Principality of Arbanon; Kingdom of Albania; Principality of Albania; Principality of Kastrioti; League of Lezhë; Ottoman Empire; Albania
- Open to the public: Yes

Location
- Location within Albania
- Coordinates: 41.255°N 19.854°E

Site history
- Built: 6th century AD
- Built by: Justinian I
- In use: 6th century AD – unknown
- Materials: Stone & concrete
- Battles/wars: Battles under Skanderbeg

Garrison information
- Past commanders: Mamica Kastrioti
- Garrison: Karl Muzakë Thopia

Petrelë Castle (Albanian: Kalaja e Petrelës) is a castle in Petrelë, central Albania. Its history dates back to the 6th century, when it was built by the Byzantine emperor Justinian I. Petrelë Castle is 329 metres (1,079 ft) above sea level.

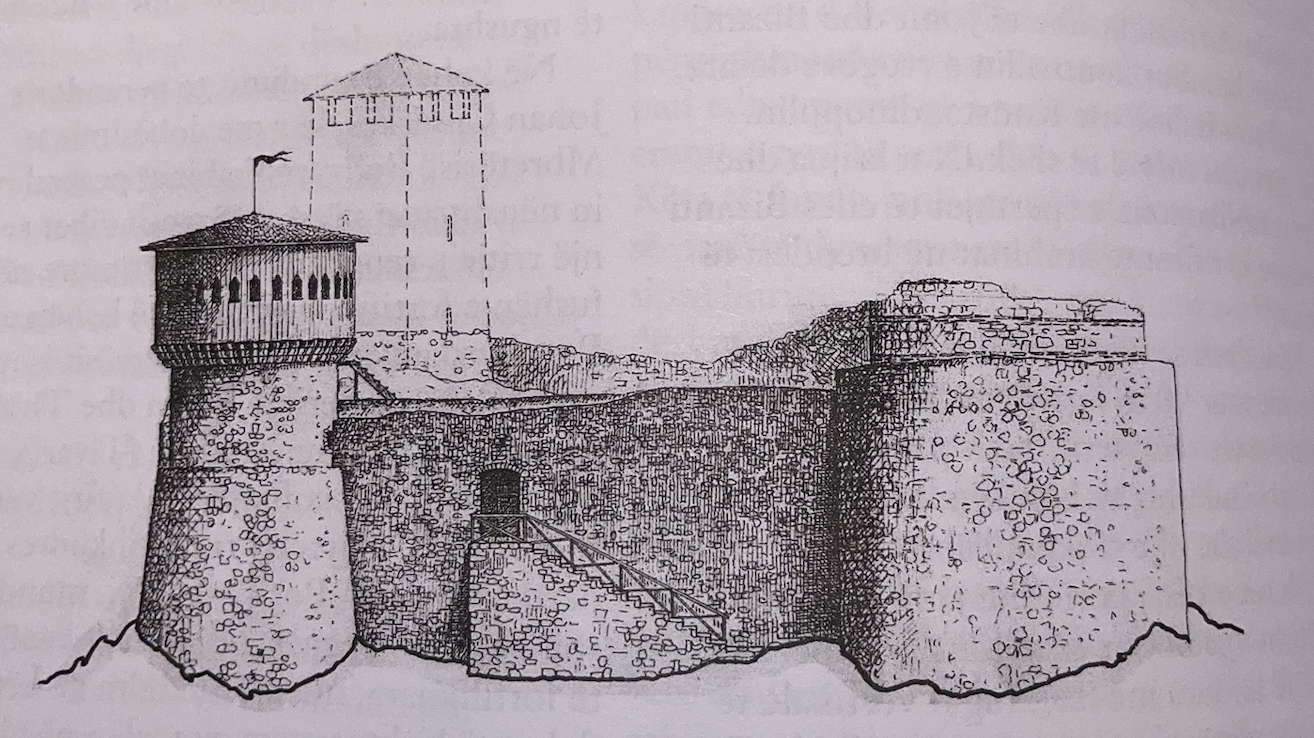
Sketch of the Partial reconstruction of Petrelë Castle.

It is one of the tourist locations close to Tirana that attracts a great number of visitors. In the castle, the prominent wooden structure is a restaurant, perched on a rocky hill, above the village with the same name. It has a triangular shape with two observation towers. Although it was first built in ancient times, the present building dates from the 15th century.

The Petrela Castle was part of the signaling and defense system of Krujë Castle. The castles signaled to each other by means of fires. During Skanderbeg’s fight against the Ottomans, the Petrela Castle used to be under the command of Mamica Kastrioti, Skanderbeg's sister. Today there is a restaurant inside the castle. The castle site has views of the Erzen valley, the hills, olive groves, and surrounding mountains.

== Gallery ==
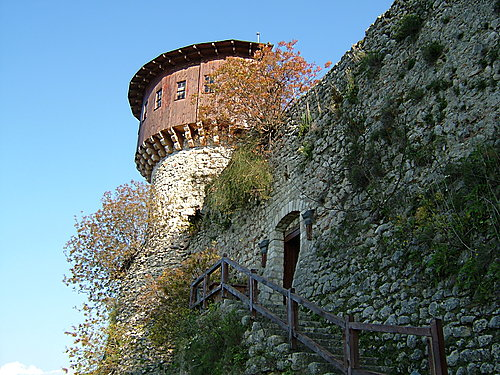

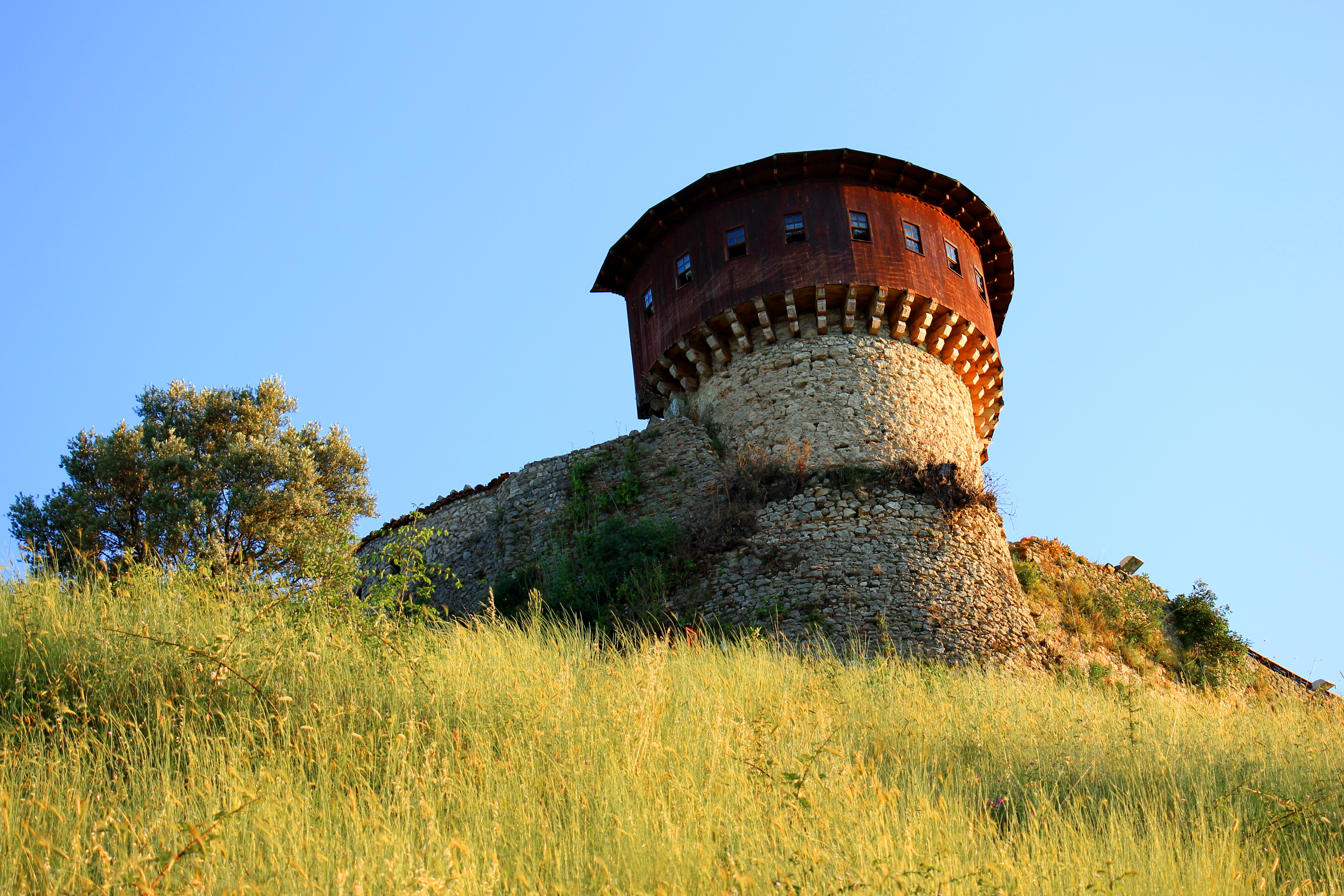

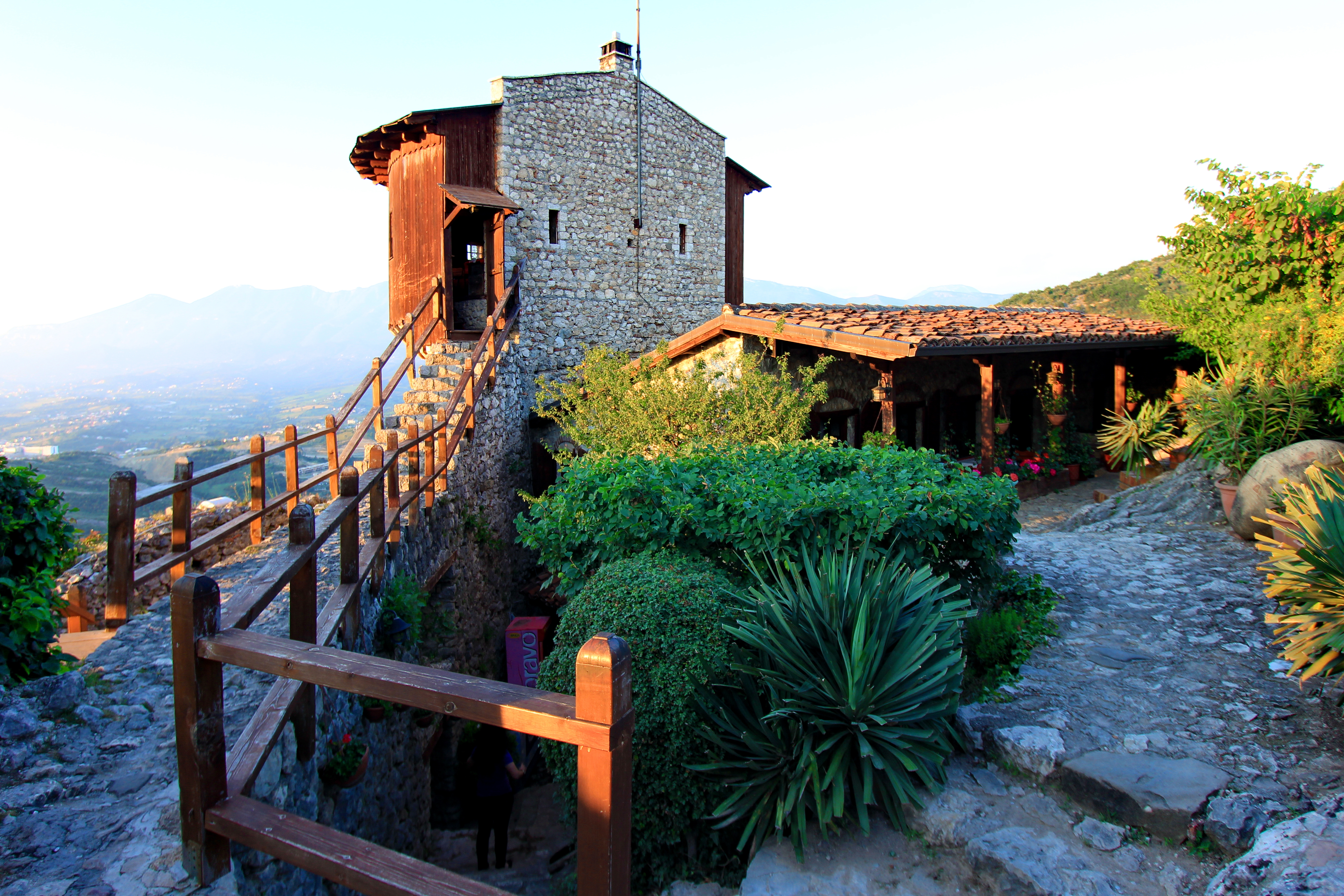

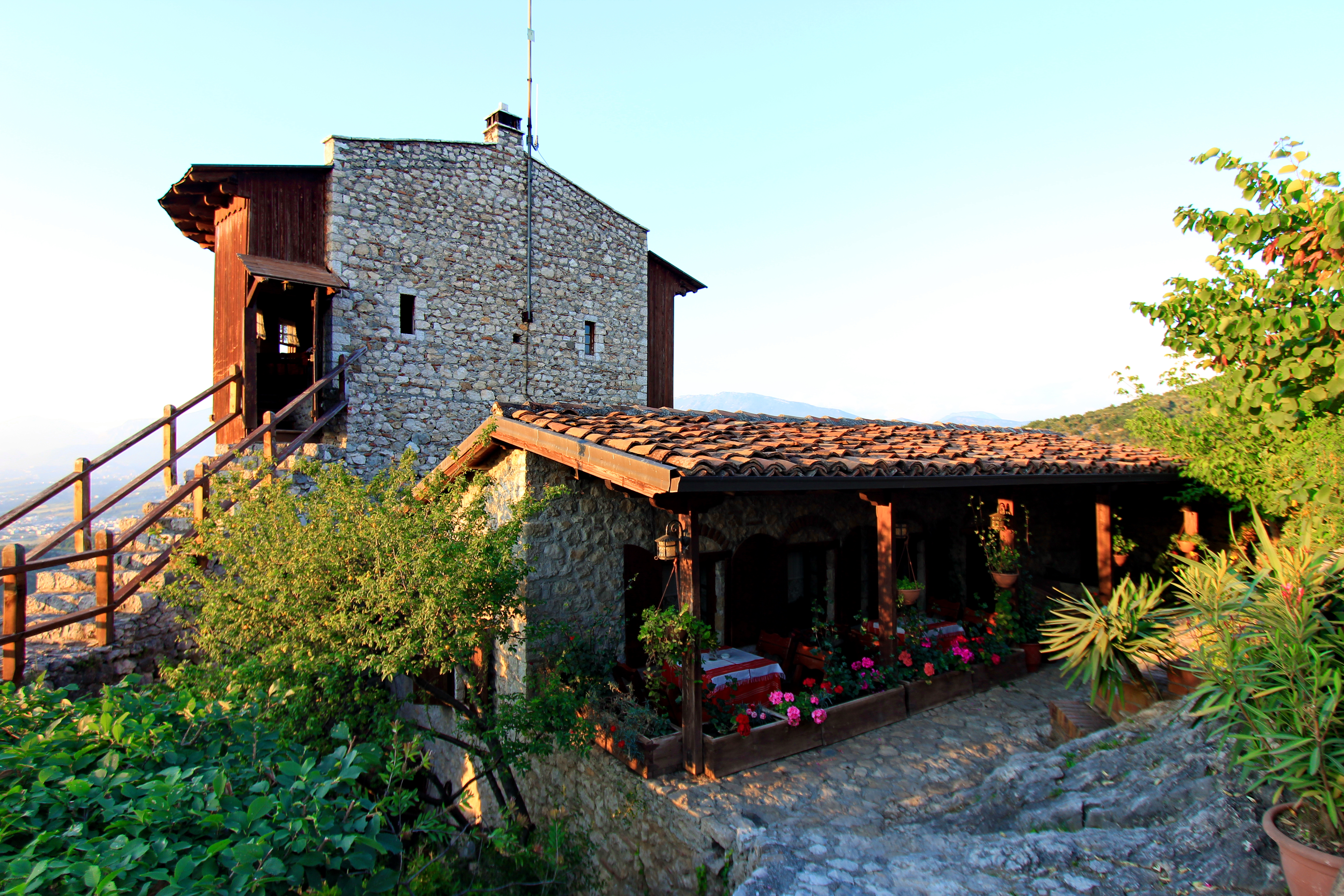

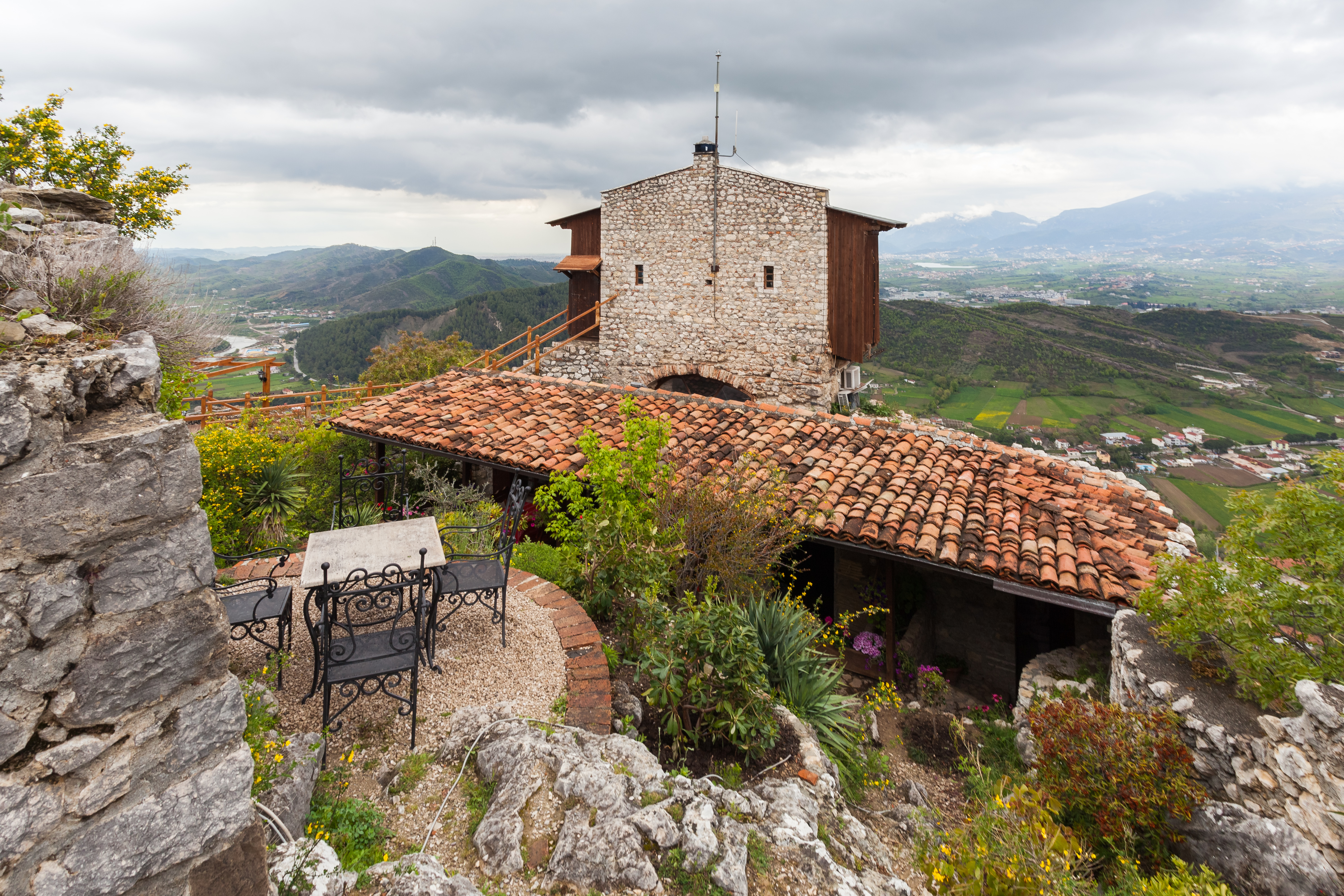

== See also ==
- List of castles in Albania
- Tourism in Albania
- Architecture of Albania
- History of Albania
