= Trebishte =

Trebishte may refer to:

- Trebishte, Bulgaria, a village in the Smolyan Municipality of southern Bulgaria.
- Trebište, a village in the Mavrovo and Rostuša Municipality of western Republic of Macedonia.
- Trebishte, Albania, a village in the Bulqizë Municipality of eastern Albania
