= Adžievci =

Adžievci Аџиевци
- Village
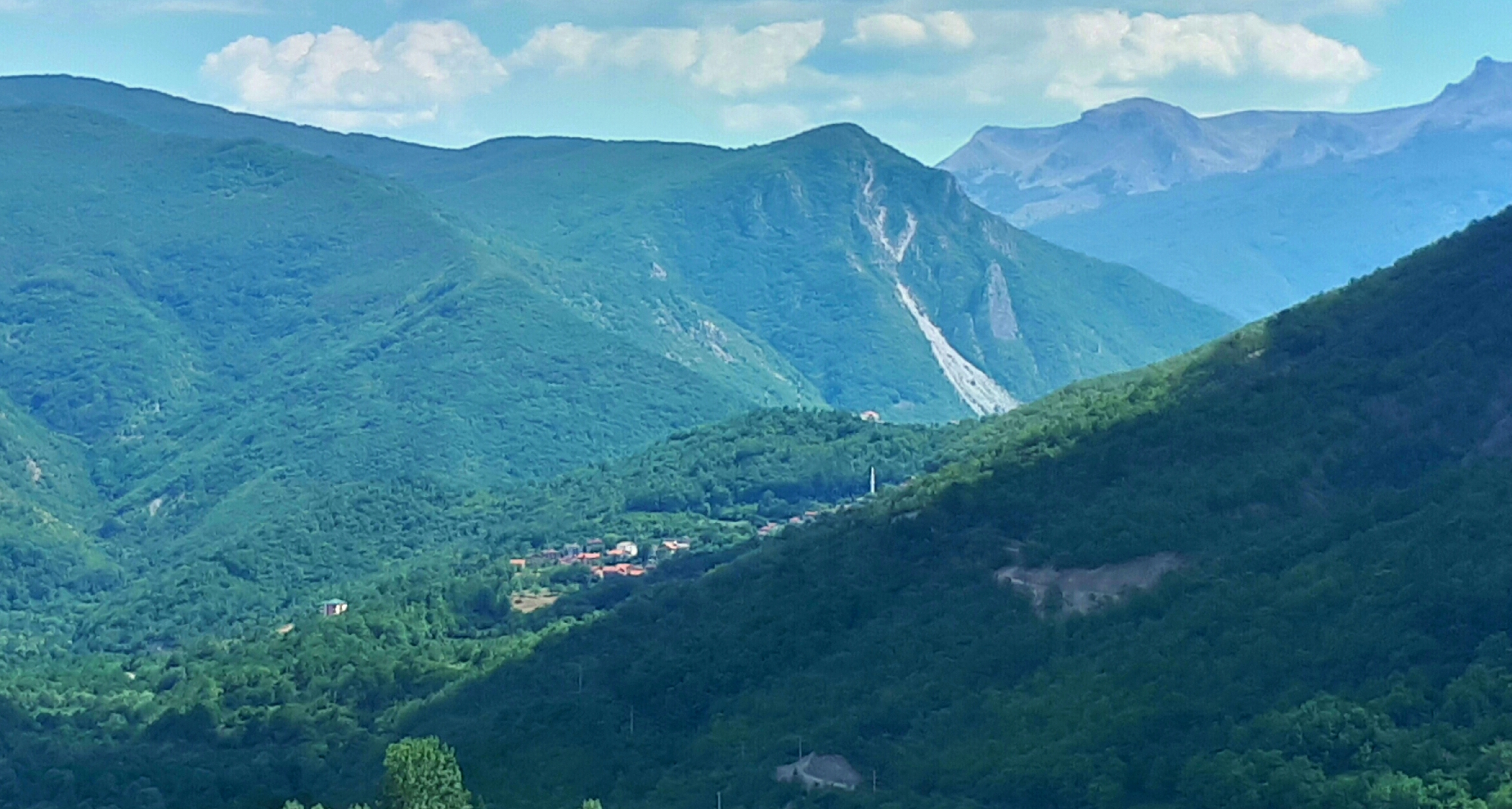
- View of the village from the distance

- Location within North Macedonia
- Coordinates: 41°35′20″N 20°36′47″E
- Country: North Macedonia
- Region: Polog
- Municipality: Mavrovo and Rostuša

Population (2002)
  - Total: 149
- Time zone: UTC+1 (CET)
  - Summer (DST): UTC+2 (CEST)
- Car plates: GV
- Website: .

Adžievci (Macedonian: Аџиевци) is a village in the municipality of Mavrovo and Rostuša, North Macedonia.

== Name ==
The village in Albanian is known as Haxhioci.

== Demographics ==
Adžievci has traditionally been inhabited by a Torbeš population.

In Kanchov's Bulgarian census of 1900, Adžievci consisted of 115 Bulgarian Muslims, while in 1916 it had 166 inhabitants. In the 1925 register of the Yugoslav Kingdom it numbered 21 houses with 85 inhabitants and belonged to the municipality of Prisojnica.

According to the 1942 Albanian census, Adžievci was inhabited by 118 Muslim Albanians.

In the 1994 census it had 204 inhabitants, of which 71 were declared Turks, 43 Macedonians, 6 Albanians and 84 others.

According to the 2002 census, the village had a total of 149 inhabitants. Ethnic groups in the village include:

- Macedonians 93
- Turks 56

As of the 2021 census, Adžievci had 100 residents with the following ethnic composition:

- Macedonians 8
- Albanians 7
- Others (including Torbeš) 31
- Turks 43
- Persons for whom data are taken from administrative sources 11
