= Viduše =

Viduše Видуше
- Village
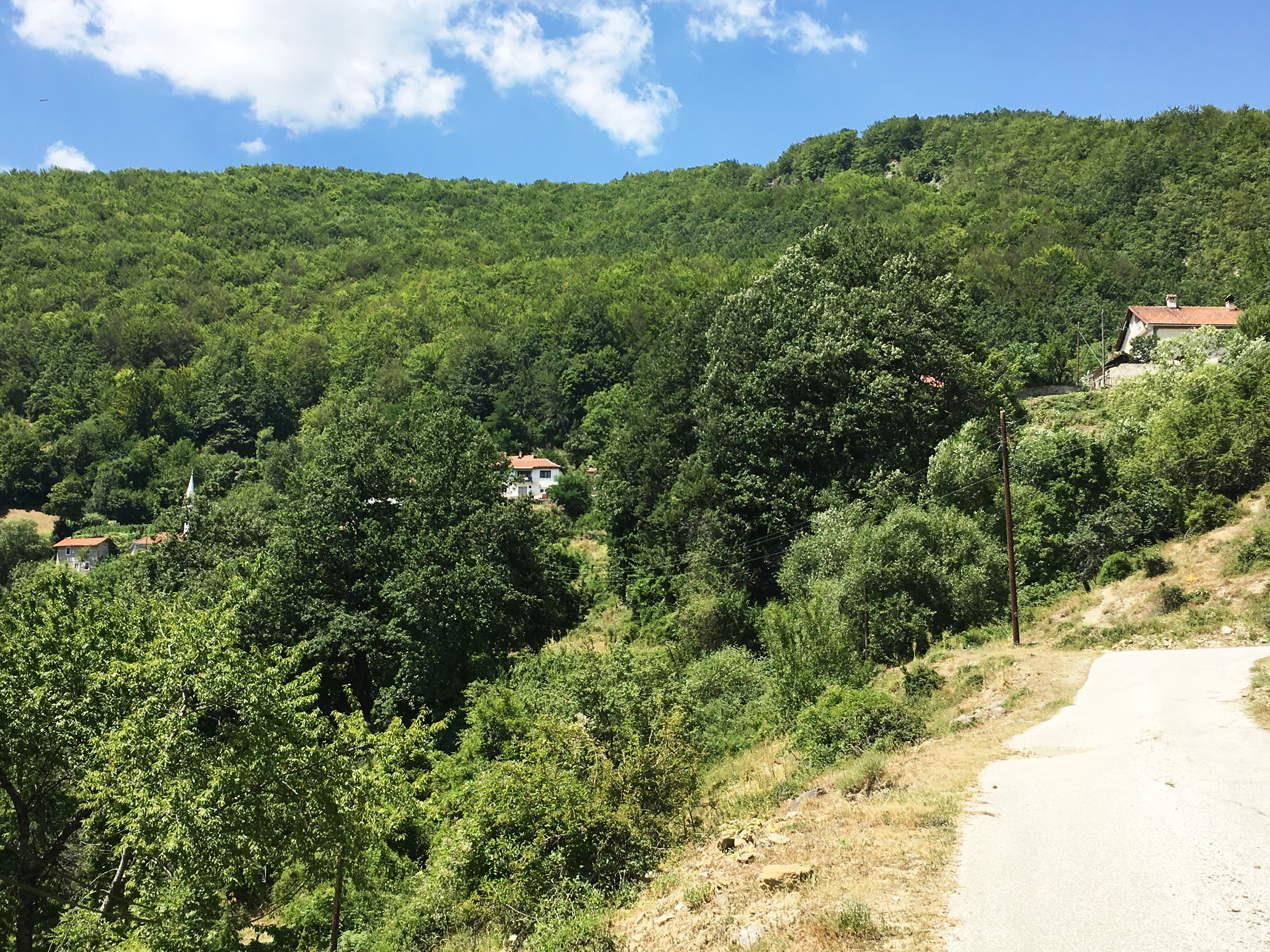
- Houses in the village Viduše

- Location within North Macedonia
- Coordinates: 41°40′N 20°35′E
- Country: North Macedonia
- Region: Polog
- Municipality: Mavrovo and Rostuša

Population (2002)
  - Total: 185
- Time zone: UTC+1 (CET)
  - Summer (DST): UTC+2 (CEST)
- Car plates: GV
- Website: .

Viduše (Macedonian: Видуше) is a village in the municipality of Mavrovo and Rostuša, North Macedonia.

== Demographics ==
Viduše is attested in the Ottoman defter of 1467 as a village in the ziamet of Reka which was under the authority of Karagöz Bey. The village had a total of five households and the anthroponyms recorded depict a mixed Slavic-Albanian character, with clear cases of Slavicisiation: Gjergj Miladinoviqi, Bogiçe Bogoslavi, Petka Malika and Gjure Alekoviqi.

Viduše has traditionally been inhabited by a Torbeš population.

According to the 1942 Albanian census, Viduše was inhabited by 367 Muslim Albanians.

According to the 2002 census, the village had a total of 185 inhabitants. Ethnic groups in the village include:

- Macedonians 152
- Turks 24
- Albanians 9
