= Mamica Kastrioti =

15th century Albanian Princess

- Princess of Mat
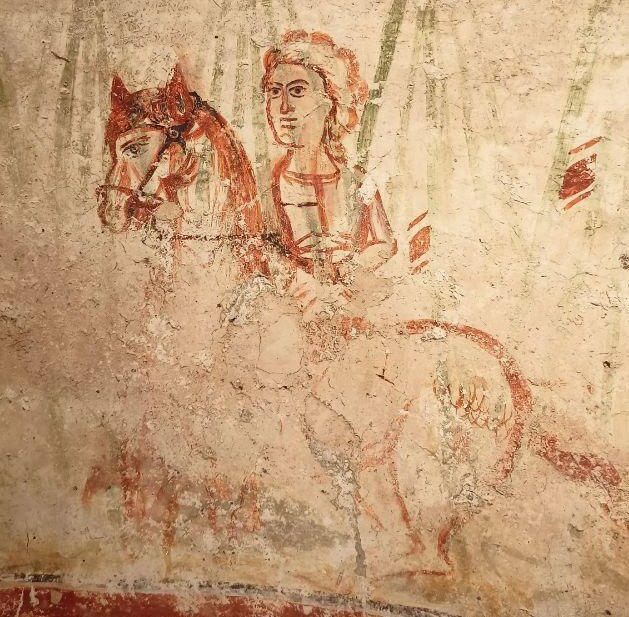
- Wall painting in St. Anthony Church, Durrës, believed to depict Mamica Kastrioti
- Born: 15th century Principality of Kastrioti
- Spouse: Karl Muzakë Thopia
- Issue: Yela Thopia; Unknown daughter Gjon Thopia; Gjergj Thopia; Ali Bej Toptani; Unknown son
- Dynasty: Kastrioti
- Father: Gjon Kastrioti
- Mother: Voisava Kastrioti

Mamica Kastrioti was a 15th-century Albanian princess and noblewoman from the House of Kastrioti. She is best known as the younger sister of the Albanian hero Skanderbeg and resided in the Petrelë Castle, located in modern-day Petrelë, which was under her command.

== Life ==
=== Ancestry ===
Mamica was the daughter of the Albanian feudal lord Gjon Kastrioti and his wife Voisava Kastrioti. Not much is known about her early life.

=== Marriage ===
On January 26th, 1445 in Musachiana, which was between Krujë and Durrës, she married Karl Muzakë Thopia, who hailed from the powerful Thopia family. This was controversial because Karl Muzakë Thopia was already married to Suina Muzaka, with whom he had two children. Mamica's brother, Skanderbeg, broke up Karl's marriage to Suina Muzaka against everyone's wishes, including those of the children, and forced him to marry his sister.

This however wasn't the only notable event that took place on the wedding day. A dispute had occurred between the two princes Lekë Dukagjini and Lekë Zaharia; at the center of the dispute was Irene Dushmani Princess of Zadrima and Pult and the only child of Lekë Dushmani. Both the princes had fallen in love with the princess and when Irene arrived at the wedding the hostilities erupted. Both lost their temper and rushed at each other's throats. Vrana Konti and Vladan Jurica tried separating the two princes but this resulted in them getting severely wounded, Vrana in his arm and Vladan on his head. This assault between the two princes led to a real battle between the two prince's men. The battle initially appeared to favor the forces of Lekë Dukagjini, until Lekë Zaharia charged at his rival and, with a powerful blow, felled him to the ground. At a critical moment, Vrana Konti and Vladan Jurica intervened decisively, bringing the battle to a close. The aftermath saw 105 dead and approximately 200 wounded strewn across the battlefield.

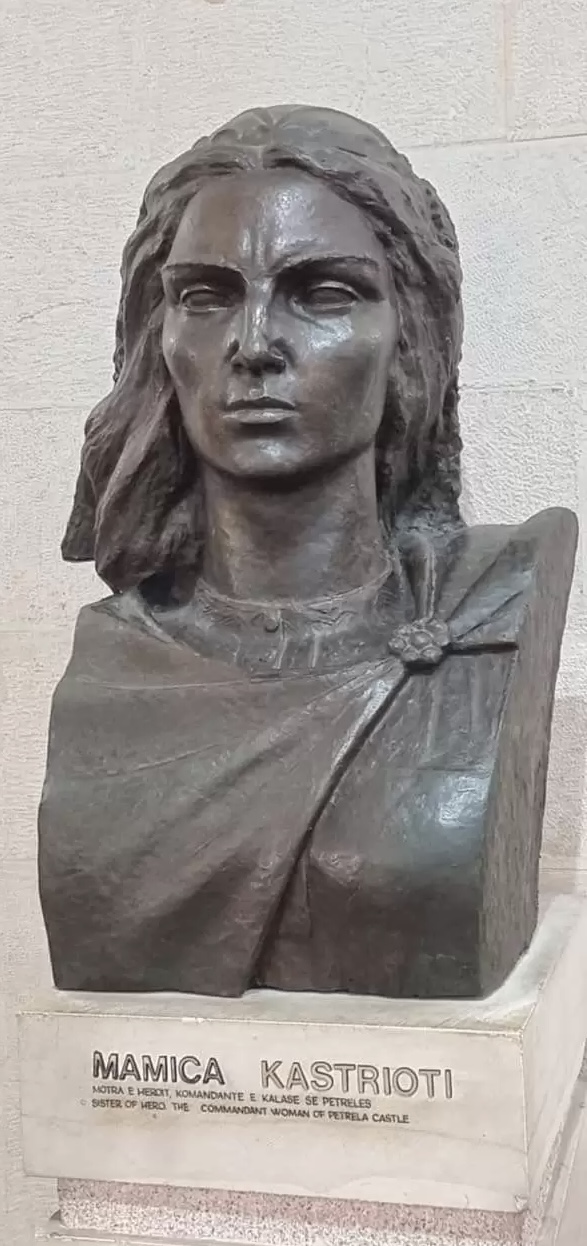
Bust of Mamica at the Skanderbeg Museum

=== Service in the League of Lezhë ===
During her brother Skanderbeg's rebellion against the Ottomans, Petrelë Castle was under the command of Mamica. The castle was an integral part of the signaling and defense network of Krujë Castle, with the fortresses communicating through signal fires. She was described as an astute and able leader who surpassed many male chieftains in battle.

In 1455 her husband, Karl Muzakë Thopia, died in the Siege of Berat.

== Family and Issue ==
Mamica married Karl Muzakë Thopia, on January 26th, 1445. The pair had six children, four sons and two daughters:

- Yela Thopia married Lord Andrew Musachi
- Unknown daughter
- Gjon Thopia
- Gjergj Thopia
- Ali Bej Toptani
- Unknown son

== See also ==
- House of Kastrioti
- Principality of Kastrioti
- Petrelë Castle
