= Zanfina Muzaka =

15th century Albanian noblewoman

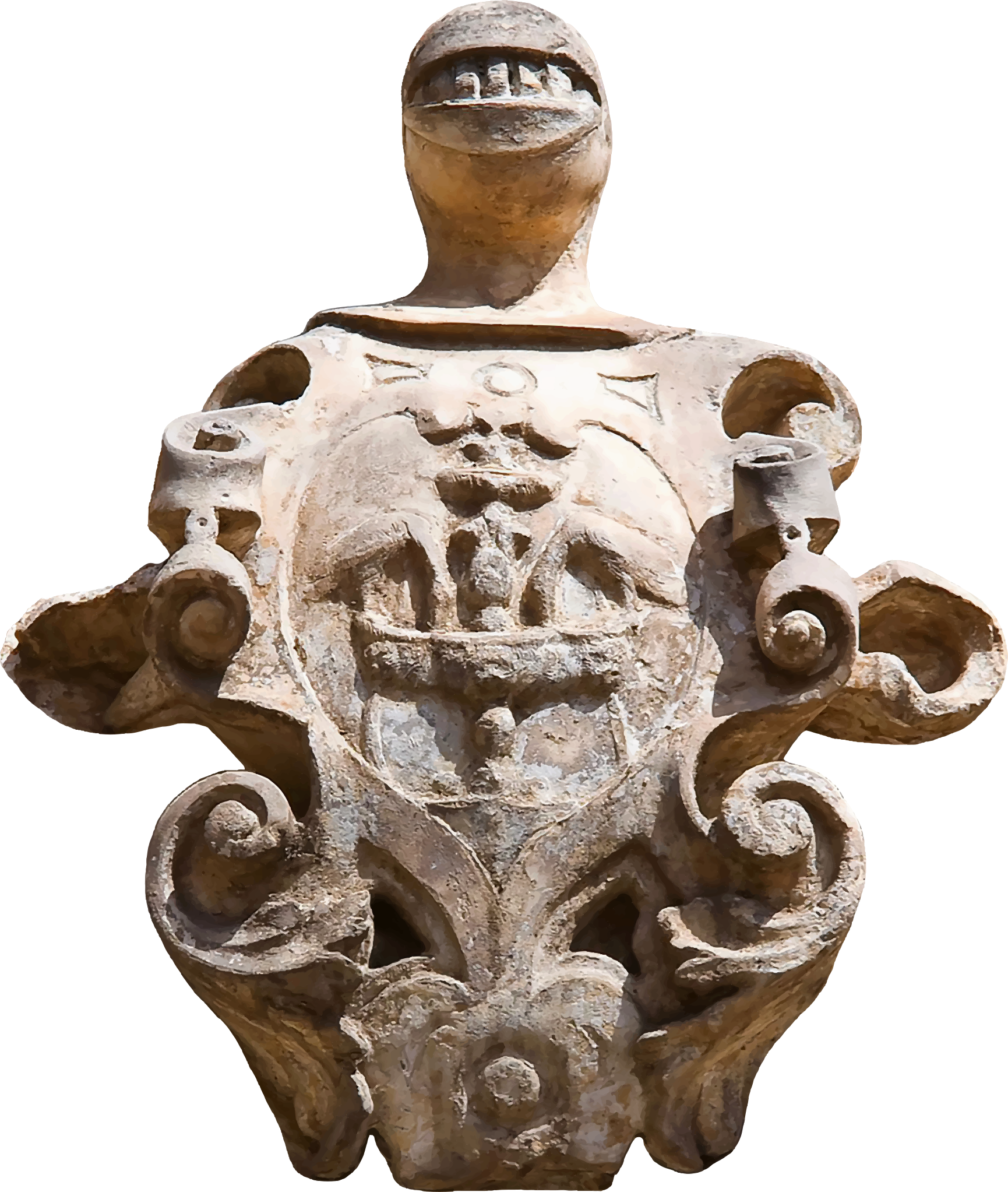
- Coat of Arms of the Muzaka family

Princess Consort of Thopia
- Successor: Mamica Kastrioti

Lady Consort of Dibër
- Predecessor: Goisava
- Born: c. mid to late 14th century Principality of Muzaka
- Died: unknown
- Spouse: Karl Muzakë Thopia; Moisi Golemi
- Issue: Andrea Thopia; Yela Thopia, Princess of Zeta; Cesare Comnino Arianiti; Despina Arianiti
- House: Muzaka
- Religion: Eastern Orthodoxy

Zanfina Muzaka, also known as Suina Muzaka, was a 15th-century Albanian noblewoman from the Muzaka family, who ruled under the title of Despots in southern Albania. She is known for her unwanted and controversial divorce from her first husband Karl-Muzak Thopia, as commanded by Skanderbeg, Lord of Albania.

== Life ==
Zanfina Muzaka was an Albanian princess and member of the Muzaka family. Little is known about her early life. She was likely named after Zanfina Arianiti Cominiata, Gjin I's wife. This could indicate her being their granddaughter through one of their sons, excluding Andrea III. Zanfina was firstly married to Karl-Muzakë Thopia with whom she had two children: Yela and Andrea. After Skanderbeg returned to Krujë, he looked for alliances with local Albanian princes. As such, he offered, possibly forced, a marriage annulment between the couple in order to have his sister Mamica Kastrioti marry Zanfina's husband. Karl-Muzakë accepted the proposal regardless of Zanfina's wishes. Later on, she married Prince Moisi Golemi from the Arianiti family, who would eventually become one of Skanderbeg's commanders. Both Karl-Muzakë Thopia and Moisi Arianiti were captured by the Ottomans, with the latter being taken to Costantinople where he was executed. She had two children with Moisi: Cesare Comnino and Despina Cominiata.
