= Voisava Kastrioti =

14th-15th Albanian noblewoman

Voisava
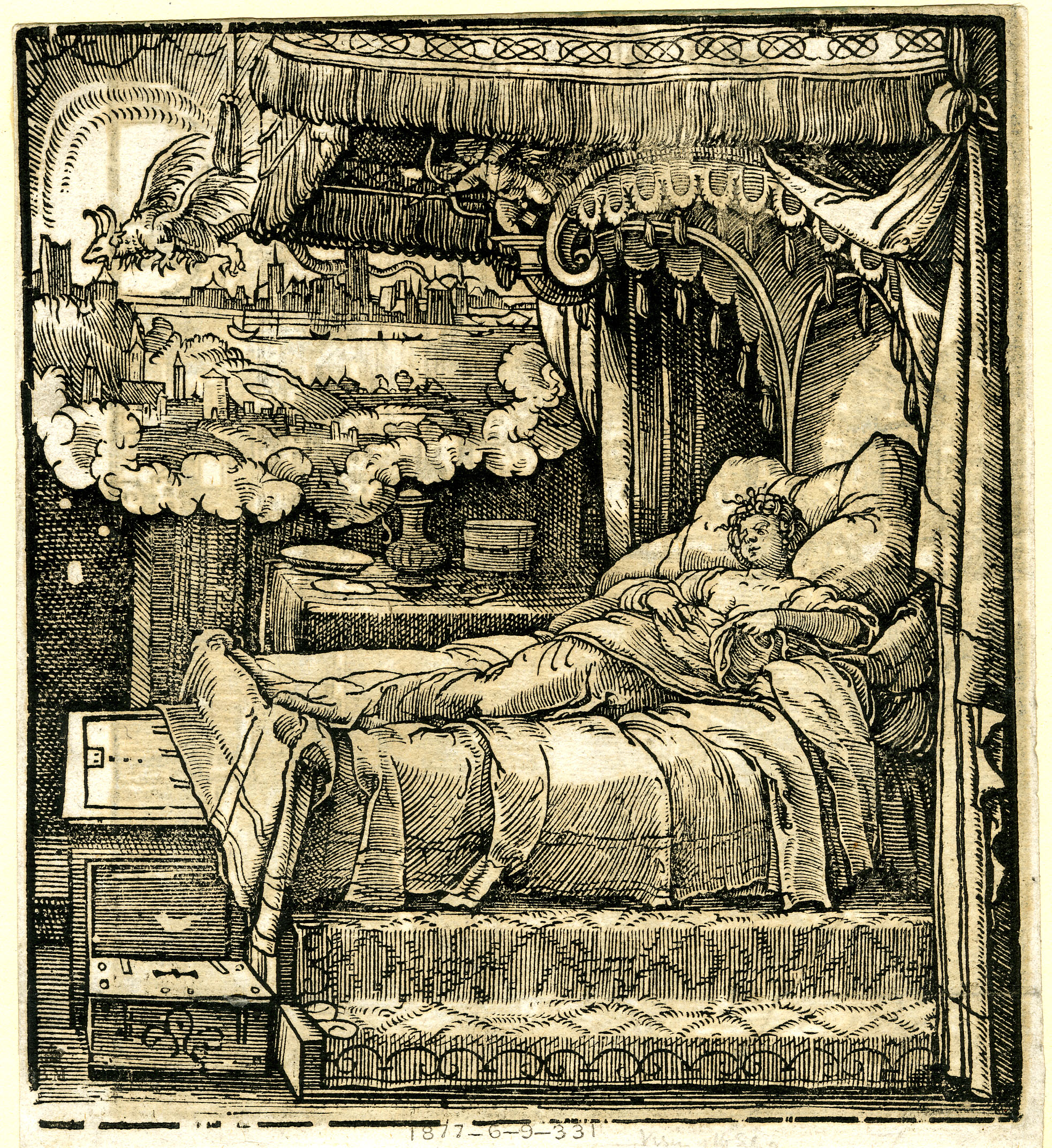
- The Dream of Skanderbeg's Mother – Jörg Breu II 1533
- Other names: Jella (Gjela), Vojsava, Vojislava
- Born: Polog, likely a reference to the Polog valley
- Noble family: Kastrioti (by marriage)
- Spouse: Gjon Kastrioti (m. 1390)
- Issue: Reposh Kastrioti; Stanisha Kastrioti; Kostandin Kastrioti; Mara Kastrioti; Gjergj Kastrioti; Jelena Kastrioti; Mamica Kastrioti; Angelina Kastrioti; Vlajka Kastrioti

Voisava was a noblewoman and wife of Gjon Kastrioti, an Albanian feudal lord from the House of Kastrioti. They had nine children together, one of whom was the Albanian national hero Gjergj Kastrioti, better known as Skanderbeg.

== Early life ==
The wife of Gjon Kastrioti is mentioned for the first time by Albanian authors Marin Barleti and Gjon Muzaka about 70–80 years after her death as Voisava. Both authors lived in the immediate generation after Skanderbeg's death and mention her origin as being in the Polog area. Barleti explicitly states that "Polog" stretched from the mountains of Mokra in southern Albania, to Skopje. It has also been argued that another Polog, closer to the town of Bitola in the plain of Pelagonia, may be the location of the Polog mentioned by Barleti. The only archival reference to her name is a notary act from the archives of the Republic of Ragusa dated July 10, 1439, which names Gjon Kastrioti's widow Jella.

=== Origin ===
The issue of the origin of Voisava has been a matter of debate among scholars. Based on a statement by Marin Barleti who described her father nobilissimus Tribalorum princeps (most noble prince of the Triballians) which was adopted in another form by Muzaka, several theories have been proposed. As such, a number of scholars believe that Voisava was of South Slavic descent. A number of other historians propose that she came from the Albanian Muzaka family based on Gjon Muzaka's assertion that she was related to his family. A modern theory interprets the reference to a nobilissimus Tribalorum princepsas referring a Serbian origin and some modern scholars consider her as coming from the Branković dynasty. However, there are no primary or archival sources that connect Voisava to the Branković. Other scholars interpret the same statement to be referring to a Bulgarian background. The name Voisava is a feminine rendition of the Slavic name Vojislav from voj (war, struggle) and slava (fame, glory). The name was in use among Albanian nobility; Karl Thopia and Gjergj Arianiti both had daughters named Voisava, indicating that the name did not have a particular ethnic affiliation in the region.

== Family ==
Voisava married the Albanian feudal landowner Gjon Kastrioti, who ruled in a region of Albania (dominus partium Albanie) which corresponds roughly to the areas between Mat and Dibër. The marriage likely happened around 1390. The family was closely linked to Orthodoxy, as shown by the foundation of the so-called "Albanian Tower" (Serbian: Arbanaški pirg) in Hilandar and the monastic life of Gjon's son Reposh. She bore 9 children to Gjon, four sons and five daughters:

- Reposh Kastrioti (fl. 1426–d. 1431), retired as an Orthodox monk in the Serbian monastery of Hilandar on Mount Athos. Reposh died and was buried in the monastery, in King Stefan Milutin's narthex, beside the north wall, his tomb bearing the inscription "duks ilirski" (Illyrian duke).
- Stanisha (fl. 1426–d. 1445), commander who was sent by Gjon to help the Serbs against the Venetians during the Second Scutari War.
- Konstandin (fl. 1426)
- Mara, married Stefan Crnojević, Lord of Zeta (r. 1451–65)
- Skanderbeg (Gjergj Kastrioti, 1405–1468), Albanian magnate and general; Ottoman subaşi of Krujë, sanjakbey of Dibra, later organizer of the League of Lezhë, and Neapolitan vassal as of 1451
- Jelena (or Jela), married Pavle Balšić with whom she had, according to Noli, three sons.
- Mamica, married Karl Muzakë Thopia on January 26th, 1445 with whom she had six children, four sons and two daughters.
- Angelina, married Vladan Arianiti, brother of Gjergj Arianiti.
- Vlajka, married Gjin Muzaka, secondly Stefan Strez Balšić with whom she possibly had sons Ivan and Gojko.

== Early sources ==
The earliest works mentioning Voisava are:

- Marin Barleti, the Albanian-Venetian historian, wrote in his biography of Skanderbeg (published between 1508 and 1510), that her father was "a noble prince (or ruler) of the Triballi" (pater nobilissimus Triballorum princeps).
- Gjon Muzaka, a member of the Albanian Muzaka family in Italy, mentioned her in his chronicle first as Visava Tribalda and then as Voisava Tripalda, and says that she "came from a beautiful place". Furthermore, Muzaka states that his mother's side is related to Voisava's father. This led Fan Noli and Harry Hodgkinson to theorize that Voisava was a Muzaka. According to William Miller, and Johann Georg von Hahn, the surname (Tripalda) added by Muzaka is a corruption, a derivative from Barleti's quote on the Triballi.
- Andrea Angelo Comneno, a member of the Albanian Engjëlli family from Drisht mentioned her in his 1551 work titled "Genealogia d'imperatori romani et constantinopolitani et de regi prencipi et signori che da Isatio Angelo & Vespasiano imperatore suo nipote son discesi, per infino al presente anno 1551" links her to the Muzaka family. This medieval Italian text, preserved in the National Central Library of Florence, states: "Coi de Musachia ha generato Voissaua ch'hebbe Iuuam Castriotto signor di Croia et del conta do detto Emathia," meaning, "From the house of Muzaka descends Voisava, the wife of Gjon Kastrioti, Lord of Krujë and Count of Emathia (Mat)."

== In historiography ==
=== Albanian origin ===
- Johann Georg von Hahn (1811–1869), a German expert in Albanian studies, had several theses on the genealogy of Albanian noble families in Albanesische Studien (1854). In Reise durch die Gebiete von Drin und Wardar (1867/69), he theorized that if one of Vrana Konti's descendants held the title "Marchese di Tripalda," then Vrana and Voisava Tripalda might have been related by blood.
- Fan Noli (1882–1965), an Albanian-American writer, in his 1947 biography of Skanderbeg, adopted the view that she came from the Muzaka family.
- Harry Hodgkinson (1913–1994), a British writer and Balkans expert, considered her a member of the Muzaka family as well. Oliver Schmitt stated that Hodgkinson had done no archival research.
- Boško Bojović, a Serbian medievalist with a research focus on the relations of the Kastrioti family to Mount Athos (Hilandar), considers her a member of the Muzaka family.

=== Bulgarian origin ===
- Strashimir Dimitrov (1892–1960), a Bulgarian historian, stated that she was a daughter of a local Bulgarian lord (boyar) from Macedonia.
- Kasëm Biçoku states that in Barleti's work, the term "Triballian" is used as a synonym for "Bulgarians". He notes that there is no archival evidence that Voisava was part of the Brankovic family.

=== Serbian origin ===
- Karl Hopf (1832–1873), a German historian and expert in Byzantine studies, in Chroniques Greco-romanes (1873), concluded that she was the daughter of a Serbian lord from Polog.
- William Miller (1864–1945), an English medievalist, criticized in his review the claim that Skanderbeg was purely Albanian. He pointed out that Skanderbeg's mother had a Slavic name and that the epithet 'Tripalda' is derived from 'Triballi', a term used by Byzantine historians for Serbs. Miller also questioned why Skanderbeg would donate villages to the Serbian monastery Hilandar on Mount Athos if "he had no connection to Serbia".
- Vasil Zlatarski (1866–1935), a Bulgarian medievalist, mentioned her as the daughter of a Serbian nobleman.
- Tatomir Vukanović (1907–1997), a Serbian ethnologist, stated that she was the daughter of a Serbian nobleman from the Polog region. He further argued that this connection influenced the Slavic names given to her sons and their later substantial donation to the Hilandar Monastery.
- Robert Elsie (1950–2017), a Canadian-born German Albanologist, mentioned her as a Slavic woman, related to the noble Serbian Brankovići family.
- Oliver Schmitt, a professor of South-East European history at Vienna University, writes in his biography Skanderbeg: Der neue Alexander auf dem Balkan (2009) that she was likely a Serbian noblewoman, belonging to the Branković family and the daughter of Grgur Branković.

=== Ambiguous origin ===
- Boban Petrovski, a Macedonian historian and author of Voisava Tribalda (2006), hesitantly concludes that there is a possibility that Voisava was of Slavic origin, most likely Serbian, as she may have been the daughter of a lord of the Triballians (Serbs) in Polog who ruled before the Ottoman conquest. He had several theses on the ultimate identity of Voisava's father: "If the Branković family indeed governed Polog in the last decade of the 14th century, it arises the chance that Voisava was a daughter of Grgur Branković or even Vuk Branković." However, he says, "the word "Tribalda" associated with Scanderbeg's mother's name does not necessarily mean ethnic determination, but could represent a state qualification, or could refer to his father's service to Stefan Lazarević, despot of medieval Serbia".

== Sources ==
- Biçoku, Kasëm (2007). "Peshkopata e Arbnit dhe Kastriotët [The bishopric of Arbni and the Kastriots]". Studime Historike. 03–04.
- von Hahn, Johann Georg (1867). Reise durch die Gebiete des Drin und Wardar: im Auftrage der K. Akademie der Wissenschaften unternommen im Jahre 1863 (in German). Vienna: Aus der Kaiserlich-Königlichen Hof- und Staatsdruckerei.
- Hopf, Karl (1873). Chroniques gréco-romanes: inédites ou peu connues, pub. avec notes et tables généalogiques. Bibliopoleion. pp. 301, 533. Dominicus alias Moncinus [genuit]: 1. Agnese Andre Angeli mater, & 2. Voisava Ivani uxorem. (Karl Hopf: Chroniques gréco-romanes inédites ou peu connues, Berlin, p. 308). Uxor is Latin for "wife, spouse". (appendix, Giovanni Musachi, Historia della casa Musachia)
- Noli, Fan Stilian (1947). George Castrioti Scanderbeg (1405–1468) (in Albanian). International Universities Press. OCLC 732882.
- Petrovski, Boban (2006). "Воисава Трибалда (Voisava Tribalda)" (PDF). makedonika.org (in Macedonian).
- Schmitt, Oliver Jens (2009). Skanderbeg: der neue Alexander auf dem Balkan (in German). Regensburg: Verlag Friedrich Pustet. ISBN 978-3-7917-2229-0.
- Vukanović, Tatomir P. (1971). "Словенска симбиоза породице Ђурђа Кастриота Скендербега". Врањски Гласник (VII). Народни музеј Врање.
- Omari, Jeton (2014). Scanderbeg tra storia e storiografia [Skanderbeg between history and historiography] (PDF) (Thesis). University of Padua.
- Bojović, Boško (2020). "Byzance et les Slaves méridionaux : alliances dynastiques matrimoniales (Xe –XVe siècles) " (PDF). Revue des Études Sud-Est Européennes. LVIII (1–4).
