= Rostuše =

Rostuše Ростуше
- Village
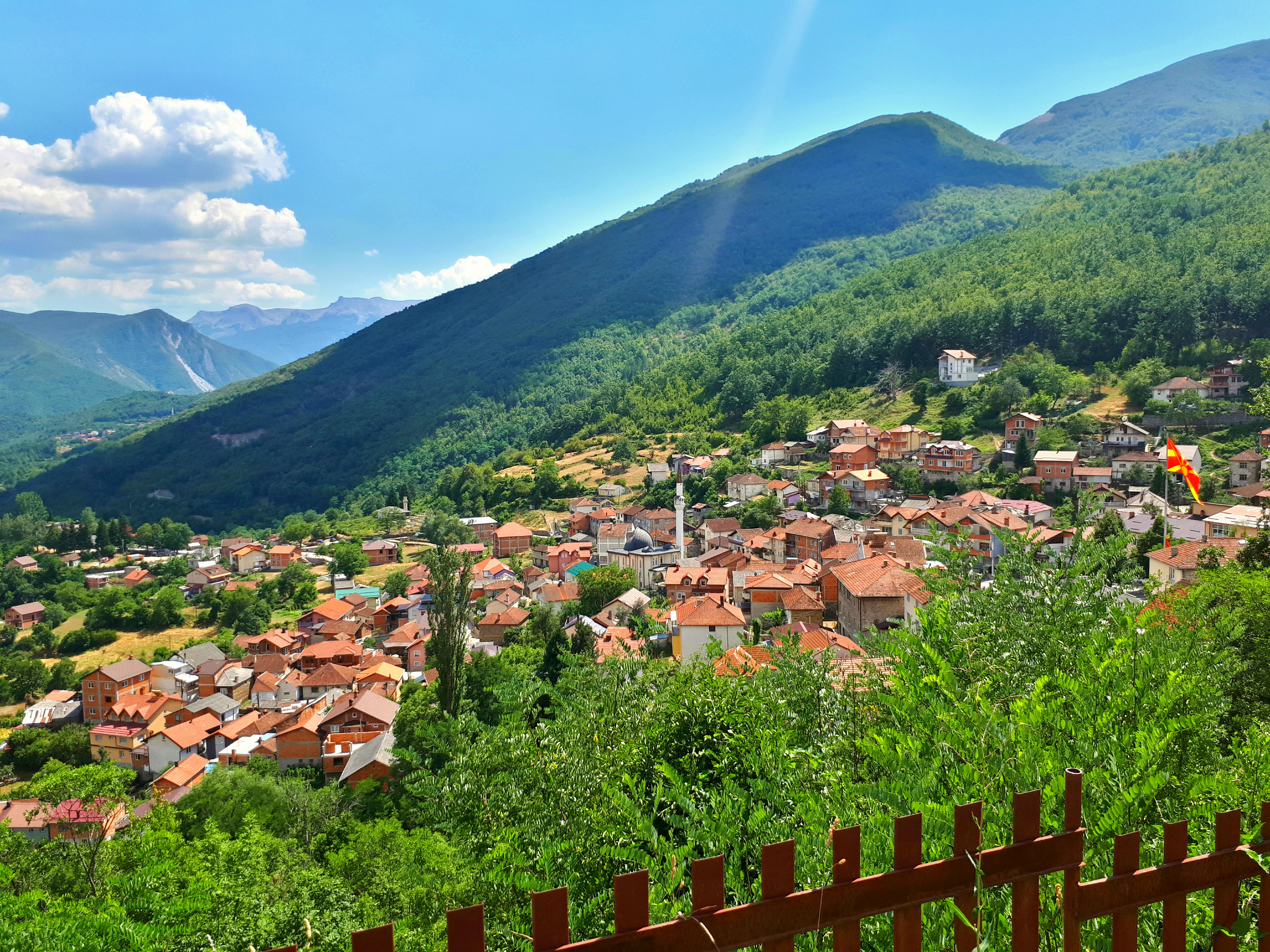
- Rostuše

- Location within North Macedonia
- Coordinates: 41°37′N 20°36′E
- Country: North Macedonia
- Region: Polog
- Municipality: Mavrovo i Rostuše

Population (2002)
  - Total: 872
- Time zone: UTC+1 (CET)
  - Summer (DST): UTC+2 (CEST)
- Vehicle registration: GV

Rostuše (Macedonian: Ростуше) is a village and the seat of the municipality of Mavrovo i Rostuše, North Macedonia.

== History ==
In the Middle Ages the village was known as Radostuša (Macedonian: Радостош). In 1426, Gjon Kastrioti and his sons donated the villages of Rostuše and Trebište together with the Church of Saint Mary to the Hilandar Monastery.

== Ottoman period ==
Rostuše is attested in the Ottoman defter of 1467 as a village within the Reka area, under the authority of Karagöz Bey. The register records a total of 15 households. The household heads listed in the defter are:

- Stanše Gjorgović (Kjorković)
- Istvan (Stevan), his brother
- Ninče Koklar
- Pop Petar
- Ninče Blašti
- Nikola Kovač
- Buklin, son of Rajo
- Pop Vlatko
- Gjuro Kovač
- Gjore (Kjore) Kirać
- Staniša Vladislav (Sode), his brother
- Gjuro Bodrikani (Budričani)
- Dragoe, son of Joka

The Ottoman register records personal names only and does not provide information on ethnic affiliation.

== Culture ==
A church dedicated to the Holy Mother of God was consecrated in 2023 as a reconstruction of an older church. The Saint Jovan Bigorski Monastery is located nearby.

== Demographics ==
Rostuše has traditionally been inhabited by a Torbeš and an Orthodox Macedonian population.

According to the 2002 census, the village had a total of 872 inhabitants. The ethnic composition was as follows:

- Macedonians – 397
- Turks – 427
- Albanians – 41
- Bosniaks – 2
- Others – 5
