= Karl Muzakë Thopia =

15th-century Albanian nobleman

- Lord of Berat
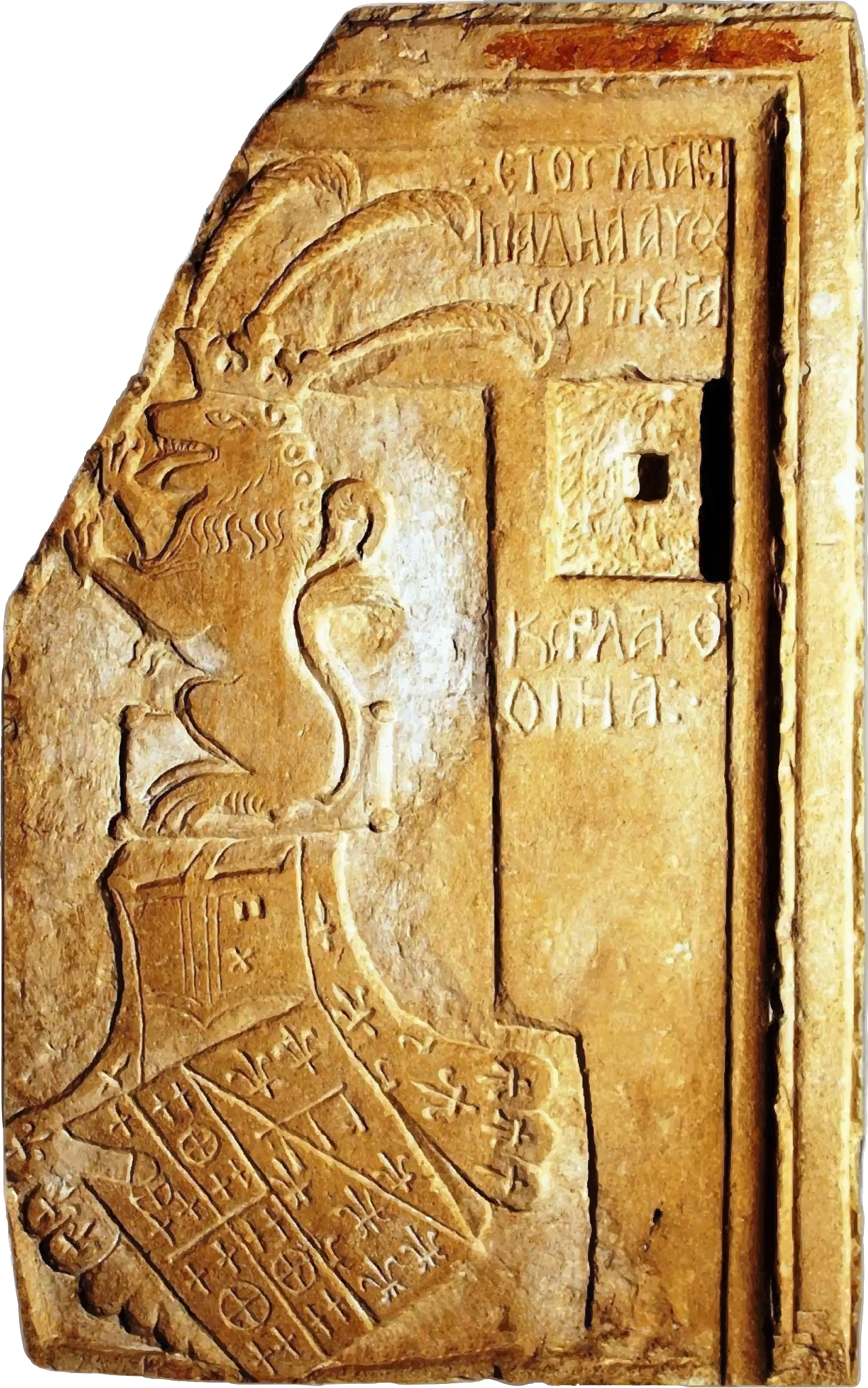
- Coat of arms of the Thopia family

Lord of Berat
- Born: 1415–1420
- Died: July 1455; Berat Castle
- Spouse: Zanfina Muzaka (first marriage); Mamica Kastrioti (second marriage)
- House: Thopia; Muzaka
- Father: Andrea II Thopia
- Mother: Unknown
- Religion: Christianity

Karl Muzakë-Thopia, also known as Karl Muzaka Thopia, was a 15th-century Albanian nobleman and military commander in service of the League of Lezhë. He was garrisoned as the commander of Berat at the Berat Castle, which is the location of his death, and the brother in-law of Albanian national hero Skanderbeg.

== Life ==
=== Early life and ancestry ===
Karl was born during the years 1415–1420 into the aristocratic Thopia family who were a noble Albanian family who ruled over Central Albania. His father was Andrea II Thopia, lord of Scuria (near modern-day Durrës), whilst his mother remains absent and unknown from historical sources. Not much is documented about Karl's early life.

=== Divorce and controversy ===
On January 26, 1445, in Musachiana, which was between Krujë and Durrës, by the order of her older brother Skanderbeg, Mamica Kastrioti married Karl. This was controversial because Karl Muzakë Thopia was already married to Suina Muzaka before marrying Mamica, with whom he had two children. Mamica's brother, Skanderbeg, broke up Karl's marriage to Suina Muzaka against everyone's wishes, including those of the children, and forced him to marry his sister, as part of Skanderbeg's bid to create alliances with local Albanian princes.

This however wasn't the only notable event that took place on the wedding day. A dispute had occurred between the two princes Lekë Dukagjini and Lekë Zaharia, at the center of the dispute was Irene Dushmani Princess of Zadrima and Pult and the only child of Lekë Dushmani. Both the princes had fallen in love with the princess and when Irene arrived at the wedding the hostilities erupted. They lost their heads and rushed at each other's throats.

Vrana Konti and Vladan Jurica tried separating the two princes but this resulted in them getting severely wounded, Vrana in his arm and Vladan on his head. This assault between the two princes led to a real battle between the two prince's men. The battle initially appeared to favor the forces of Lekë Dukagjini, until Lekë Zaharia charged at his rival and, with a powerful blow, felled him to the ground. At a critical moment, Vrana Konti and Vladan Jurica intervened decisively, bringing the battle to a close. The aftermath saw 105 dead and approximately 200 wounded strewn across the battlefield.

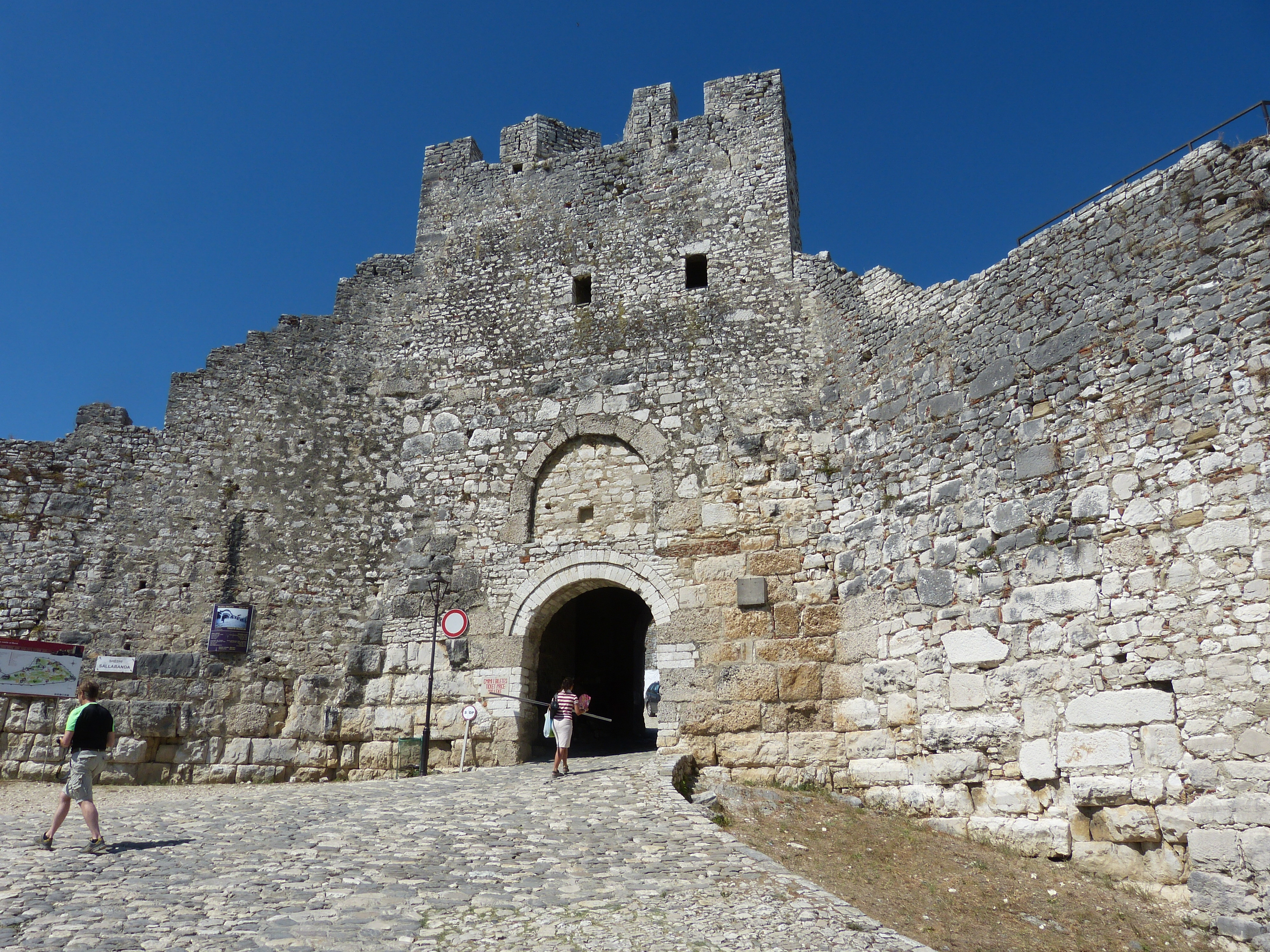
Berat Castle – main historic gate

=== Siege of Berat and death ===
Before the Ottoman siege, Skanderbeg and his forces besieged the Ottoman-occupied castle and began pounding it with the help of the Aragonese-Neapolitan artillery. The commander of the Ottoman garrison then proposed to hand over the city if no reinforcements would come for a month. Believing the situation was well in hand and that the castle would fall, Skanderbeg left with a sizable contingent of his army in the direction of Valona.

At the head of the remaining force he left Karl, his brother-in-law. After a successful bombardment, the Ottoman commander of the garrison agreed to turn over the keys to the castle if the sultan had not sent reinforcements within a certain amount of time. This was a ploy to fool the Albanian forces into a false sense of security and delay any actions, giving reinforcements time to arrive. When the sultan and his reinforcements arrived in mid-July, the Albanian army degenerated into a total rout and lost 6,000 men. Karl himself died during the siege as well as Gjin II Muzaka.

== Family and issue ==
In his first marriage with Zanfina Muzaka from the house of Muzaka, they had the following issue:

- Yela Thopia married Đurađ Crnojević
- Andrea (or Andrew) III Thopia

In his second marriage with Mamica Kastrioti from the house of Kastrioti, they had 6 children in total, 4 sons and 2 daughters:

- Yela Thopia married Lord Andrew Muzaka
- Unknown Daughter
- Gjon Thopia
- Gjergj Thopia
- Ali Bej Toptani
- Unknown Son

== See also ==
- Thopia family
- Principality of Albania (medieval)
- Siege of Berat (1455)
- Skanderbeg's rebellion
