= Principality of Kastrioti =

Principality of medieval Albania

Principality of Kastrioti Principata e Kastriotit
- 1389–1444
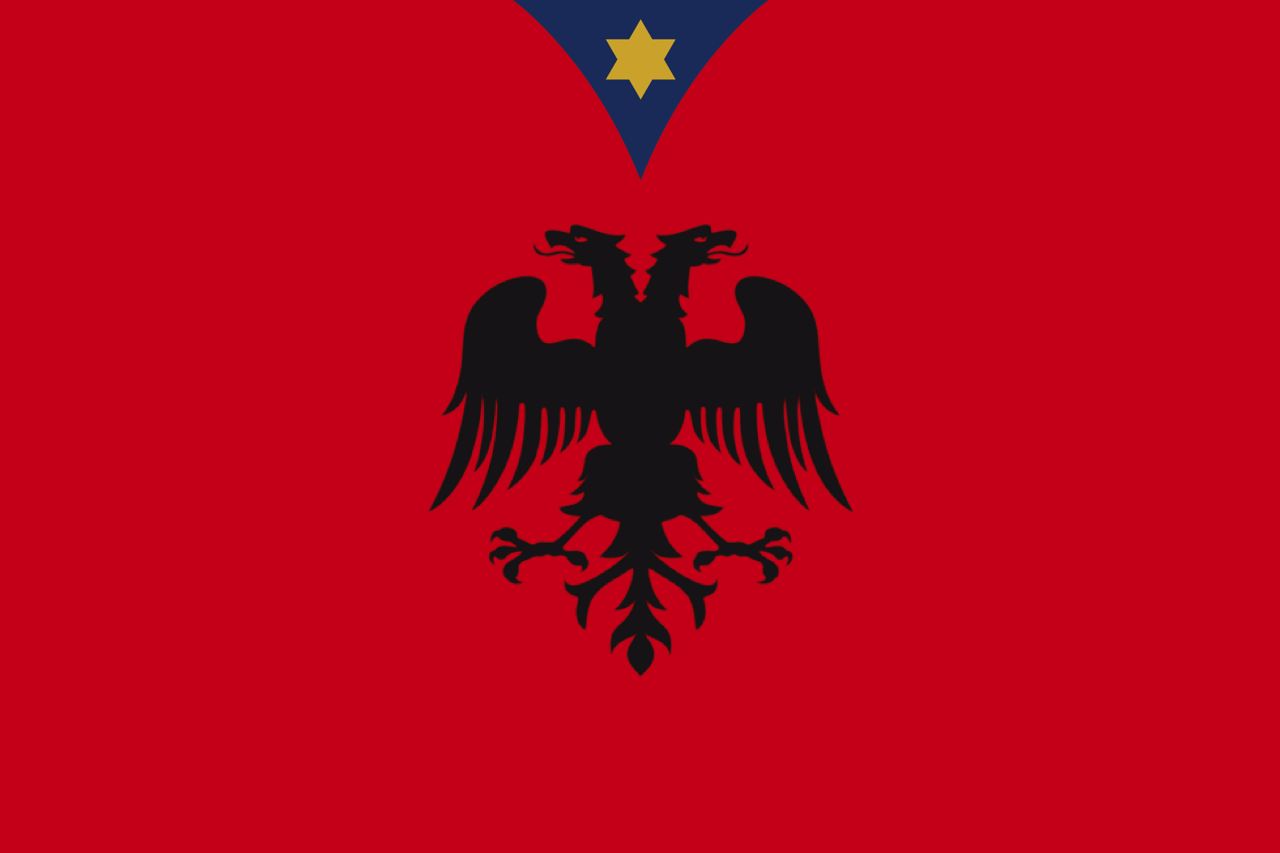
- Banner of arms Coat of Arms

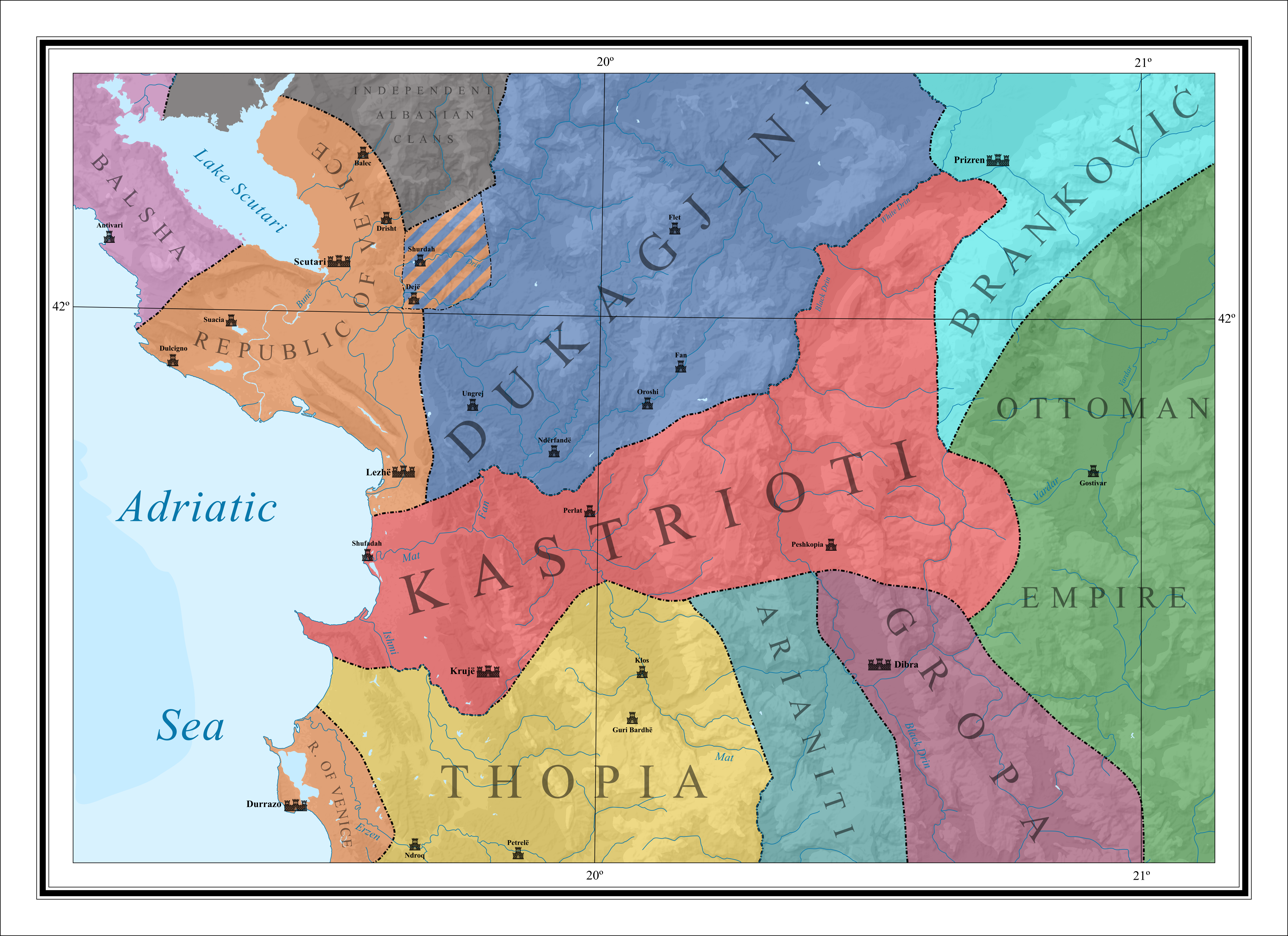
- Domains of the Kastrioti, 1420
- Status: Principality
- Capital: Krujë (after November 1443)
- Common languages: Albanian
- Religion: Eastern Orthodox (1389–1431); Islam (1431-1443); Roman Catholicism (1443–1444)
- Prince
  - 1389–1407: Pal Kastrioti
  - 1407–1437: Gjon Kastrioti
  - 1443-1468: Gjergj Kastrioti
- Historical era: Medieval
  - Established: 1389
  - Fall under Ottoman Empire: 1437
  - Regained control: 1443
  - The establishment of the League of Lezhë: 1444
Preceded by	Succeeded by
Serbian Empire	League of Lezhë
- Today part of: Albania; Kosovo; North Macedonia

The Principality of Kastrioti (Albanian: Principata e Kastriotit) was one of the Albanian principalities during the Late Middle Ages. It was formed by Pal Kastrioti who ruled it until 1407, after which his son, Gjon Kastrioti ruled until his death in 1437 and then ruled by the national hero of Albania, Skanderbeg.

== Formation ==
Gjon Kastrioti originally had only two small villages. In a short time, Gjon Kastrioti managed to expand its lands so as to become the undisputed lord of Central Albania. At the end of the fourteenth and the start of the fifteenth century he managed to carve the principality from Ishmi to Prizren.

Gjon Kastrioti married Voisava Tripalda who bore 5 daughters, Mara, Jela, Angjelina, Vlajka, and Mamica, and 4 sons, Reposh, Stanisha, Kostandin and Gjergj Kastrioti (who would come to be known as Skanderbeg). Gjon Kastrioti was among those who opposed the early incursion of Ottoman Bayezid I, however his resistance was ineffectual. The Sultan, having accepted his submissions, obliged him to pay tribute to ensure the fealty of local rulers, and to send his three sons Gjergj Kastrioti to the Sultan's court as hostages. After his conversion to Islam, the young Skanderbeg attended military school in Edirne and led many victorious battles for the Ottoman Empire. For his military victories, he received the title Arnavutlu İskender Bey, (Albanian: Skënderbe shqiptari, English: Lord Alexander, the Albanian) comparing Kastrioti's military brilliance to that of Alexander the Great.

Marin Barleti wrote that the Kastrioti lineage originated from a noble stock in Emathia (Mat).

== Rise of Skanderbeg ==
Skanderbeg was distinguished as one of the best officers in several Ottoman campaigns both in Asia Minor and in Europe, and the Sultan appointed him General. He fought against Greeks, Serbs and Hungarians, and some sources say that he used to maintain secret links with Ragusa, Venice, Ladislaus V of Hungary, and Alfonso I of Naples. Sultan Murat II gave him the title Vali which made him General Governor. On November 28, 1443, Skanderbeg saw his opportunity to rebel after the Battle of Niš against the Hungarians led by John Hunyadi in Niš as part of the Crusade of Varna. He switched sides along with 300 other Albanians serving in the Ottoman army. After a long trek to Albania he eventually captured Krujë by forging a letter from the Sultan to the Governor of Krujë, which granted him control of the territory. After capturing the castle, Skanderbeg abjured Islam and proclaimed himself the avenger of his family and country. He raised a flag showing a double-headed eagle, an ancient symbol used by various cultures of Balkans (especially the Byzantine Empire), which later became the Albanian flag. The Governor was killed as he was returning to Edirne, unaware of Skanderbeg's intentions. Skanderbeg allied with George Arianite (born Gjergj Arianit Komneni) and married his daughter Donika (born Marina Donika Arianiti).

== League of Lezhë ==
Following the capture of Krujë, Skanderbeg managed to bring together all the Albanian princes in the town of Lezhë Historian Edward Gibbon writes that:

The Albanians, a martial race, were unanimous to live and die with their hereditary prince. ... In the assembly of the states of Epirus, Skanderbeg was elected general of the Turkish war and each of the allies engaged to furnish his respective proportion of men and money.

With this support, Skanderbeg built fortresses and organized a mobile defense force that forced the Ottomans to disperse their troops, leaving them vulnerable to the hit-and-run tactics of the Albanians. He managed to create the League of Lezhë, a federation of all Albanian Principalities.The main members of the league were the Arianiti, Balšić, Dukagjini, Muzaka, Spani, Thopia and Crnojević noble families. For 25 years, from 1443–1468, Skanderbeg's 10,000 man army marched through Ottoman territory winning against consistently larger and better supplied Ottoman forces. Threatened by Ottoman advances in their homeland, Hungary, and later Naples and Venice – their former enemies – provided the financial backbone and support for Skanderbeg's army. By 1450 it had certainly ceased to function as originally intended, and only the core of the alliance under Scanderbeg and Araniti Comino continued to fight on.

The League of Lezhë first distinguished itself under Skanderbeg at the Battle of Torvioll where he defeated the Ottoman forces. Skanderbeg's victory was praised throughout the rest of Europe. The battle of Torvioll thus opened up the quarter-century war between Skanderbeg's Albania and the Ottoman Empire.

On 14 May 1450, an Ottoman army, larger than any previous force encountered by Skanderbeg or his men, stormed and overwhelmed the castle of the city of Kruja, capital of the Principality of Kastrioti. This city was particularly symbolic to Skanderbeg because he had been appointed suba of Kruja in 1438 by the Ottomans. The fighting lasted four months and over one thousand Albanians lost their lives while over 20,000 Ottomans died in battle. Even so, the Ottoman forces were unable to capture the city and had no choice but to retreat before winter set in. In June 1446, Mehmed II, known as "the conqueror", led an army of 150,000 soldiers back to Kruja but failed to capture the castle. Skanderbeg's death in 1468 did not end the struggle for independence, and fighting continued until 1481, under Lekë Dukagjini, when the Albanian lands were forced to succumb to the Ottoman armies.

== Monarchs ==
Picture	^{Title}Name	Reign	Notes
	^{Ruler of Mat and Dibër} Pal Kastrioti	1389–1407	First ruler of the Principality of Kastrioti.
	^{Lord of Mat} Gjon Kastrioti	1407–1437	Strategically navigated the political landscape by forming alliances with major powers such as Venice and the Ottoman Empire. His diplomacy and military leadership were instrumental in expanding and consolidating the territorial influence of the Kastrioti family. He was able to maintain stability in the principality.
	^{Dominus Albaniae} Gjergj Kastrioti	1443–1468	Renowned for his military leadership, he successfully resisted Ottoman expansion into Albania for over two decades, earning widespread recognition as a national hero. Skanderbeg played a central role in the formation of the League of Lezhë, rallying Albanian nobility in a military and diplomatic alliance against the Ottoman Empire. On 2 March 1444, at the assembly of Lezhë, Skanderbeg was proclaimed "Chief of the League of the Albanian People," uniting regional chieftains and nobles to resist Ottoman expansion under his leadership.

== See also ==
- House of Kastrioti
- League of Lezhë
- Albanian principalities
- History of Albania
