= Mavrovo i Rostuše Municipality =

Municipality of North Macedonia

Coordinates: 41.61°N 20.59°E

Mavrovo i Rostuše Municipality Општина Маврово и Ростушe Mavrova ve Rostuşa Belediyesi
- Rural municipality
- Flag Coat of arms

- Country: North Macedonia
- Region: Polog
- Municipal seat: Rostuše

Government
  - Mayor: Oner Jakuposki (VMRO-DPMNE)

Area
  - Total: 663.19 km^{2} (256.06 sq mi)

Population
  - Total: 5,042
  - Density: 13/km^{2} (34/sq mi)
- Time zone: UTC+1 (CET)
- Vehicle registration: GV

Mavrovo i Rostuše (Macedonian: Маврово и Ростуше; Turkish: Mavrova ve Rostuşa) is a municipality in western North Macedonia. The municipal seat is located in the village of Rostuše. This municipality is part of the Polog Statistical Region.

== Geography ==
The municipality borders Gostivar Municipality to the north, Kičevo Municipality to the east, Debar Municipality to the south and Albania to the west.

== Demographics ==
According to the 2021 North Macedonia census, this municipality has 5,042 inhabitants. Ethnic groups in the municipality include:

	2002		2021	
	Number	%	Number	%
TOTAL	8,618	100	5,042	100
Turks	2,680	31.1	1,555	30.84
Macedonians	4,349	50.46	1,474	29.23
Albanians	1,483	17.21	470	9.32
Bosniaks	31	0.36	35	0.69
Serbs	6	0.07	6	0.12
Roma	10	0.12	3	0.06
Vlachs			2	0.04
Other / Undeclared / Unknown	59	0.68	1,092	21.67
Persons for whom data are taken from administrative sources			405	8.03

- Religious affiliation according to the 2002 Macedonia census and 2021 North Macedonia census:

	2002		2021	
	Number	%	Number	%
TOTAL	8,618	100	5,042	100
Islam	7,627	88.5	3,669	72.8
Orthodox	848	9.84	700	18.9
Christians	0	0.00	254	18.9
Catholics	14	0.16	1	18.9
Others	129	1.50	13	0.26
Persons for whom data are taken from administrative sources	n/a	n/a	405	8.04

Mother tongues declared, per the 2021 North Macedonia census, include the following:

- Macedonian: 4,120 (81.2%)
- Albanian: 355 (7.0%)
- Turkish: 138 (2.7%)
- Others: 24 (0.5%)
- Persons for whom data are taken from administrative sources: 405 (8.0%)

== See also ==
- Mavrovo National Park
