= Adelphate =

Adelphate (Serbian: адрфат, братствени удео, from the Greek adelphos = brother), is the right of some person to reside in monastery and receiving subsidies from its resources. This right was either purchased or exchanged for some property during medieval period, when feudal lords wanted to secure for themselves shelter after retirement or losing control over their fiefs. An adelphate was valid in name of the exact person, and could not be resold, transferred or even inherited by another.
