= Trebište =

Trebište Требиште Trebisht
- Village
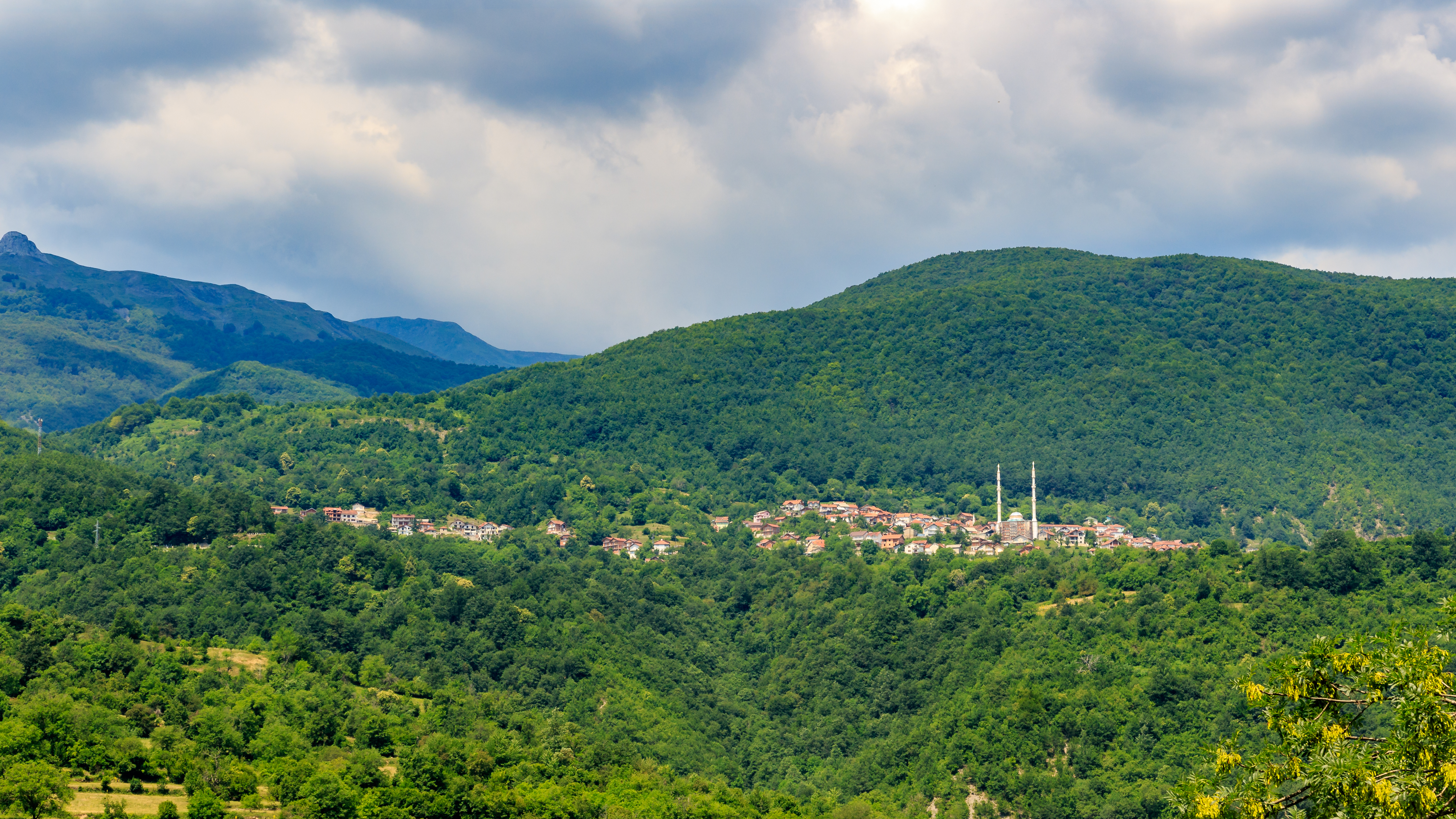
- Panoramic view of the village Trebište

- Location within North Macedonia
- Coordinates: 41°37′N 20°35′E
- Country: North Macedonia
- Region: Polog
- Municipality: Mavrovo and Rostuša

Population (2002)
  - Total: 765
- Time zone: UTC+1 (CET)
  - Summer (DST): UTC+2 (CEST)
- Car plates: GV
- Website: .

Trebište, Trebishte, or Trebišta (Macedonian: Требиште, Albanian: Trebisht) (the pronunciation used by the local population is Trebišča) is a village in North Macedonia in Mavrovo and Rostuša Municipality, situated in the Dolna Reka district, on the eastern slopes of Dešat, above the gorge of Radika.

== History ==
In 1519, 55 Christian Orthodox families were recorded in the village, while in 1583, the village had 41 Christian Orthodox families and 5 Muslim families.

== Demographics ==
Year	Macedonian	Albanian	Turks	Romani	Vlachs	Serbs	Bosniaks	Others	Total
1948	182	756	...	...	...	...	...	2	940
1953	354	268	399	...	...	...	...	3	1024
1961	233	28	640	...	...	...	...	3	904
1971	379	...	414	...	...	...	...	355	1148
1981	51	4	36	...	...	...	1037	38	1166
1994	22	39	156	...	...	...	...	889	1106
2002	303	159	277	...	...	...	18	8	765
2021	34	55	144	...	...	...	19	245	498

Trebište has traditionally been inhabited by Orthodox Macedonians and a Torbeš population.

According to the 2002 census, the village had a total of 765 inhabitants. Ethnic groups in the village include:

- Macedonians 303
- Turks 277
- Albanians 159
- Bosniaks 18
- Others 8
