= Skanderbeg's Albanian campaign (1443–1444) =

Medieval campaign

Skanderbeg's Albanian campaign Fushata shqiptare e Skënderbeut
- Part of the Albanian–Ottoman Wars
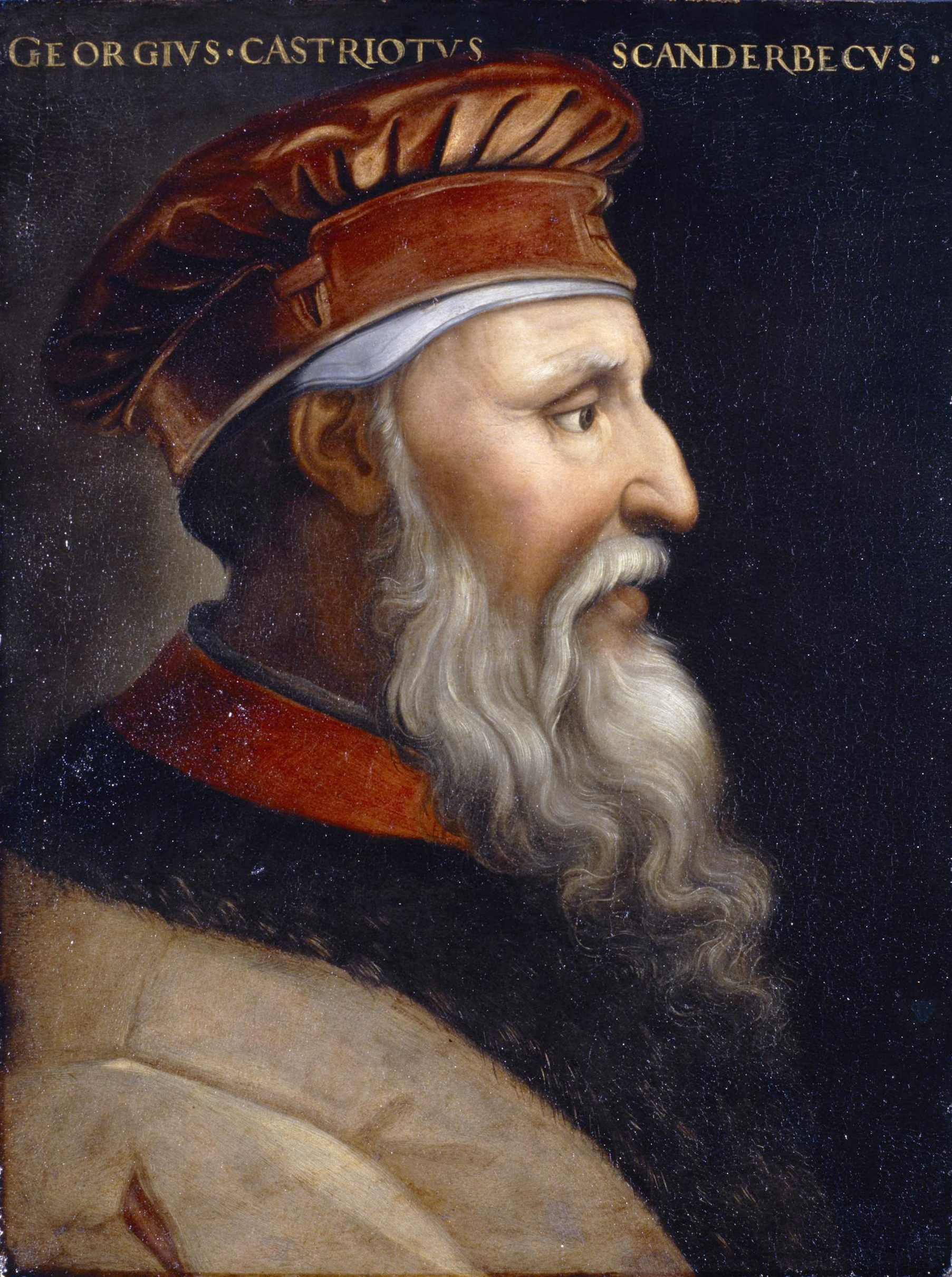
- Portrait of Gjergj Kastrioti Skanderbeg
Date	November 1443 – 2 March 1444
Location	Medieval Albania (modern-day Albania and western North Macedonia)
Result	Albanian victory: Formation of the League of Lezhë; Start of Skanderbeg's rebellion

Belligerents
Forces of Skanderbeg	Ottoman Empire

Commanders and leaders
Skanderbeg; Hamza Kastrioti; Moisi Arianiti; Teodor Korona Muzaka; Gojko Balšić; George Strez Balšić	(Ottoman Empire) Ali Bey (Ottoman Empire) Zabel Pasha (Ottoman Empire) general of Stelushi (executed)

Strength
12,000 troops	Several garrisons

Skanderbeg's Albanian campaign was a military campaign during the years of 1443-1444 commanded by Albanian "hero" Gjergj Kastrioti Skanderbeg, who upon his desertion of the Ottoman army, sought out to liberate the Albanian lands under Ottoman rule. The campaign would culminate in the capture of several crucial cities and fortresses, as well as the formation of the League of Lezhë.

According to some historians, during the campaign, Skanderbeg would impale several Ottoman officials that did not agree to be baptized.

During the campaign there would also be political correspondence between Skanderbeg and Vladislav II of Wallachia, which historian Marin Barleti wrongfully assigned to the year 1443 instead of 1444.

== Background ==
=== Kastrioti-Ottoman war ===
Skanderbeg's father, Gjon Kastrioti, taking advantage of the Ottoman siege of Thessalonica against the Venice, would mount an uprising against the Ottomans in 1428. The uprising had initial success, with the Kastrioti forces taking Krujë and then reaching Shkodër, however, when the siege ended in 1430, the Ottomans, led by Ali Bey Evrenosoğlu, would begin a campaign in Albania, capturing Svetigrad and Krujë. In order to keep a small amount of autonomy, Gjon agreed to give Svetigrad and Krujë to the Ottomans, as well as give up his sons, including Gjergj Kastrioti.

=== Albanian revolt against the Ottomans ===
In 1432, a revolt would be sparked by the Albanian noble families after Andrea II Thopia defeated a small Ottoman army near central Albania. This would also lead to the return of Gjergj Arianiti to Albania, who then would defeat an army of 10,000 Ottoman soldiers led by Ali Bey Evrenosoğlu on the Via Egnatia road near Shkumbin. During the following years, the revolt would spread to other noble families like the Zenebishi, Muzaka, Dukagjini and Kastrioti. Gjon Kastrioti's dominions would quickly grow during the revolt, however, in the summer of 1433, he would be defeated in battle by Sinan Pasha. By 1435, the revolt had been crushed.

=== Battle of Niš ===
During the Crusade of Varna, in early November 1443, the Hungarian-led crusader army of John Hunyadi would clash with an Ottoman army near Niš, in modern-day Serbia. The left-flank of the Ottoman forces consisted of 300 Albanian cavalrymen led by Skanderbeg and his nephew, Hamza Kastrioti. Before the battle commenced, they would desert the Ottoman forces and go southwards to liberate the old lands of the Principality of Kastrioti.

== Campaign ==
=== Liberation of Dibra ===
Upon abandoning the Ottoman army, Skanderbeg would force an Ottoman secretary to write a forged letter from the Sultan towards Zabel Pasha of Krujë, before executing him. The letter stated that Skanderbeg were to become the new guvernor of Krujë. After a seven-day march, Skanderbeg and his forces reached the city of Dibra, ruled by Moisi Golemi. Upon entering the city, Skanderbeg would be met with applause from the local Albanian population, before holding an assembly where the "step stones" of an anti-Ottoman Albanian uprising would be laid. His forces would be joined by hundreds of locals from Dibra, who would be positioned on the roads that led to the city with the purpose of blocking incoming Ottoman armies. Skanderbeg would then begin his march towards Krujë.

=== Liberation of Krujë ===
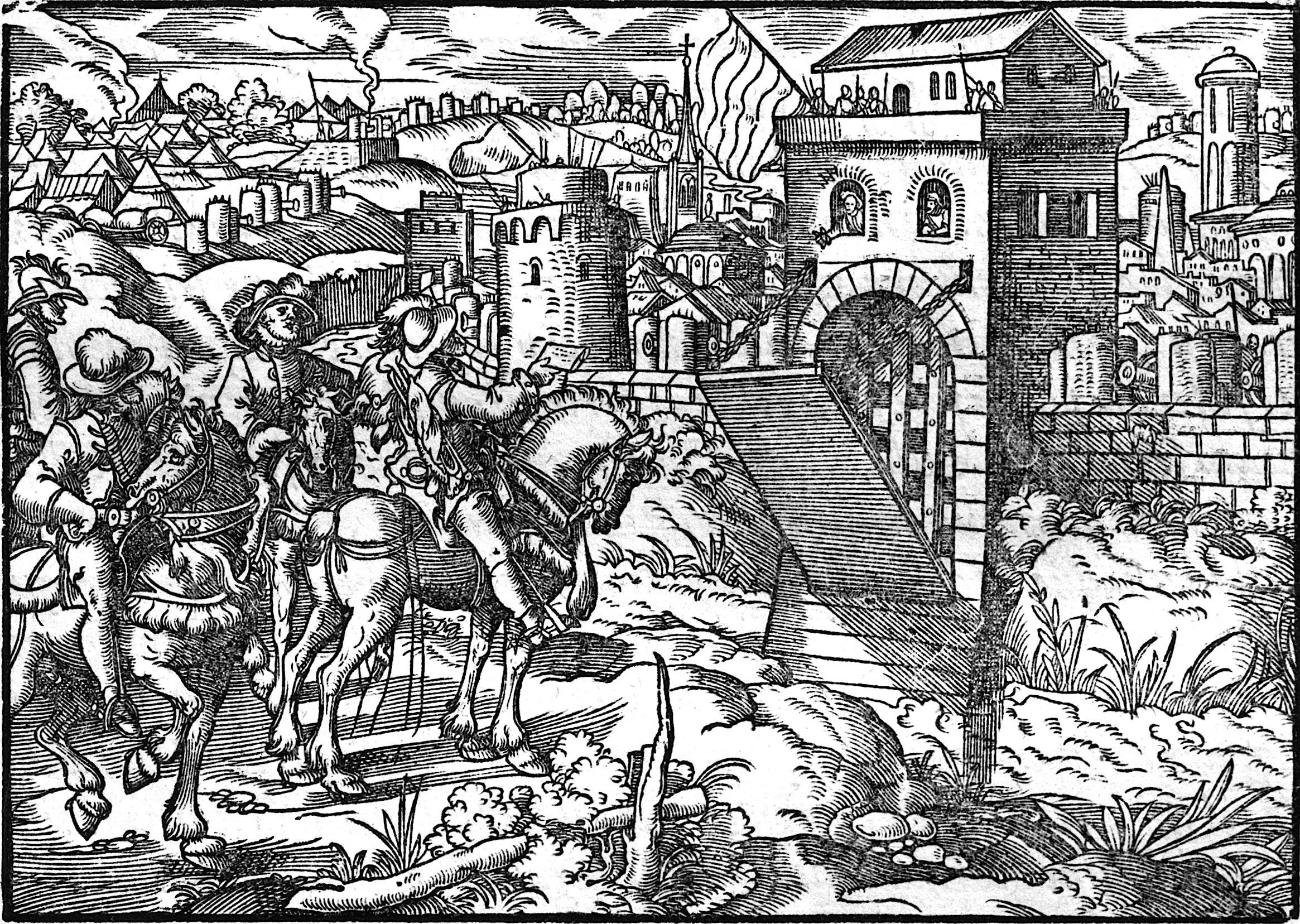
Skanderbeg's return to Krujë, (woodcut by Jost Amman).

On 28 November 1443, Skanderbeg and his 300 soldiers reached Kruja. Skanderbeg hid in the forest with his men, while Hamza Kastrioti delivered the letter to Zabel Pasha, the ruler of the city. Upon the Pasha's departure, Skanderbeg and his men entered the castle where an already present Ottoman garrison was located. At night, the Albanian forces began slaughtered the Ottoman soldiers, killing many. The group of Ottoman soldiers that remained were quickly cornered, however Skanderbeg would allow them to leave without harm. As soon as the Ottoman soldiers left the castle, it would be attacked by a swarm of Albanian peasants, with all of them being killed. Upon raising the Albanian flag, Skanderbeg would give a speech where he would state:

I did not bring you freedom, I found it here among you. As soon as I set foot here, as soon as you heard my name, all of you came to me faster, as if your fathers, brothers and sons had risen from the graves, as if God himself had descended from heaven.

=== Capture of Pezë and Petrelë ===
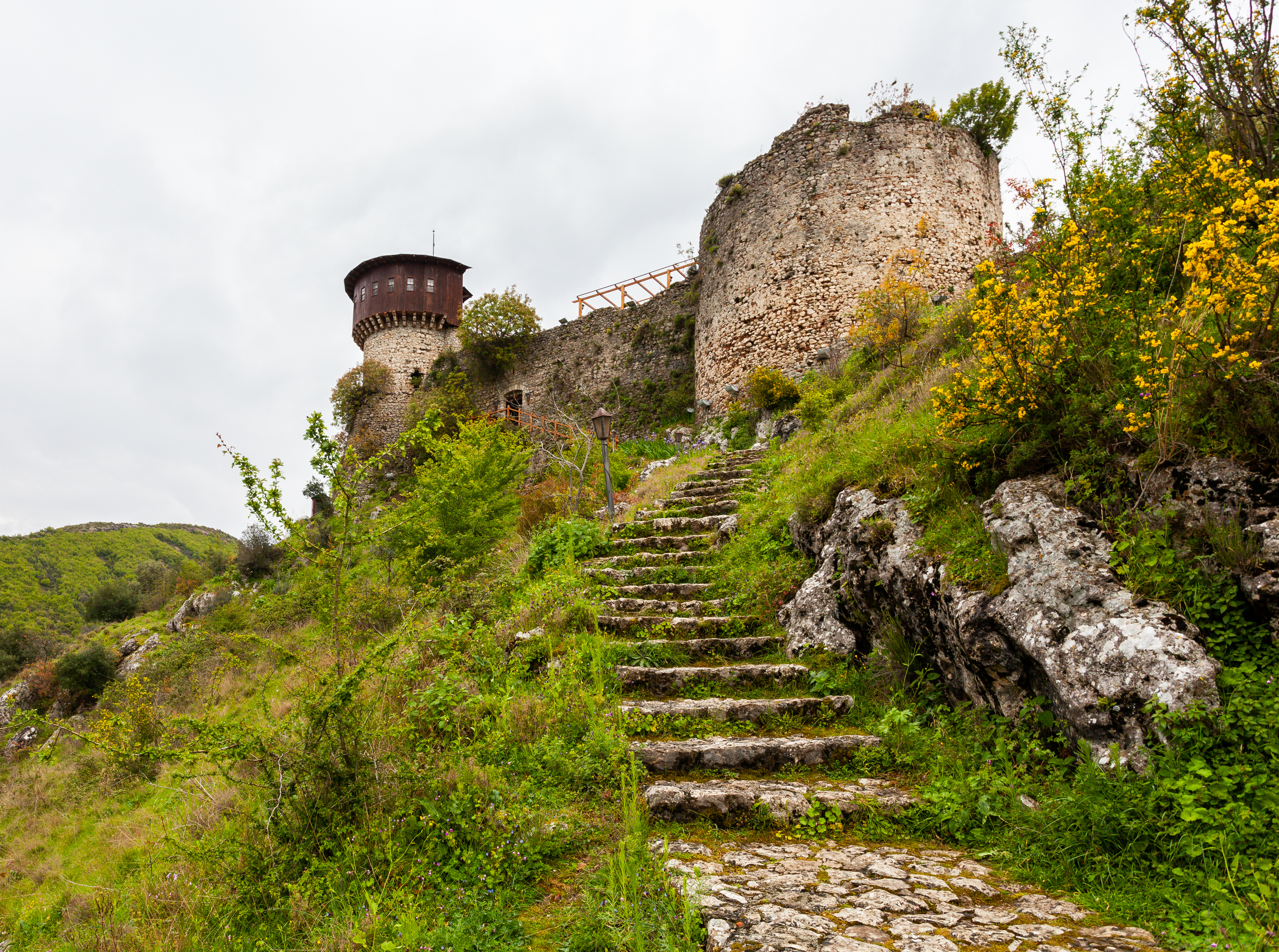
Petrelë castle

After capturing Krujë, Skanderbegs forces would grow, with him gaining the support of several Albanian noble families. Teodor Korona Muzaka of the Muzaka family together with Gojko Balsha and Gjergj Strez Balsha would join Skanderbeg's uprising, while Stefan Crnojević would send several hundred troops to aid it. By December 1443, Skanderbeg's army grew to 12,000 men. During this time he would aim to capture the castle of Petrela, an important castle located between Krrabë Pass and the Tirana valley. Skanderbeg's army consisting of 3,000 men split into two parts, one commamded by Moisi Golemi and the other by himself, before beginning their march to Petrela in the winter of 1443. According to Marin Barleti they would not use catapults or cannons for the siege as transporting them in the "harsh winter climate" proved to be difficult. Moisi Golemi's forces would capture the town of Pezë after a short battle before uniting with Skanderbeg's army on the outskirts of Petrela. Instead of besieging the fortress, Skanderbeg would give the Ottoman garrison an offer that they would not be harmed if they abandoned the castle. The garrison accepted and left Petrelë.

=== Capture of Gurë i Bardhë ===
Skanderbeg's next attack was on the Gurë i Bardhë castle also known as Petralba. The castle was located in a strategic high-ground location that controlled the roads between Mat, Krujë and Durrës. Skanderbeg gave the Ottoman garrison the same choice as the garrison of Petrelë, which they accepted.

=== Capture of Stelushi ===
After taking Gurë i Bardhë, the next attack for the Albanian rebels would be on the castle of Stelushi. The castle was located on several rocky passes, posing very difficult siege circumstances. Skanderbeg would also give the Ottoman garrison the offer of abandoning the castle and being allowed to return to their "homes", however the general in charge of the castle, whose name is not stated, would not accept. Due to this, the Ottoman garrison would tie-up their own general and give him directly to Skanderbeg before abandoning the castle of Stelushi.

According to Albanian historian and archeologists Skënder Anamali, the hill where the castle is built upon is known by the locals as "Guri i Skenderbeut" (Skanderbeg's rock).

=== Siege of Svetigrad ===
In December 1443, Skanderbeg reached Svetigrad, which was already surrounded by a group of 3,000 Albanian Dibran soldiers led by Moisi Golemi. Skanderbeg would also give his offer to the garrison, showing the captured general of Stelushi and claiming that he would be set free if the Ottomans abandoned the castle, however they did not accept, and due to this Skanderbeg beheaded the Ottoman general. Due to the conditions of the harsh winter, the Albanian rebels would choose to not directly attack the fortress until Spring, instead deciding to starve-out the Ottoman garrison. To ensure that the Sultan would not be able to send reinforcements, a group of 2,000 troops was stationed on the roads leading to the castle. The command of the siege would be given to Moisi Golemi while Skanderbeg and his guards went back to Krujë. Sometime in late February, after the winter conditions softened, the Albanian rebels would attack the fortress and capture it.

During the siege Skanderbeg would also capture the fortress of Modrič, which according to Barleti would be turned into an important stronghold.

== Aftermath ==
On 2 March 1444, Skanderbeg gathered all of the Albanian nobles in Lezhë, including Lekë Zaharia, Pal and Nicholas Dukagjini, Pjetër Spani, Lekë Dushmani, Gjergj, Gojko and Gjon Balsha, Tanush and Andrea Thopia, Gjergj Arianiti, Teodor Korona Muzaka and Stefan Crnojević.

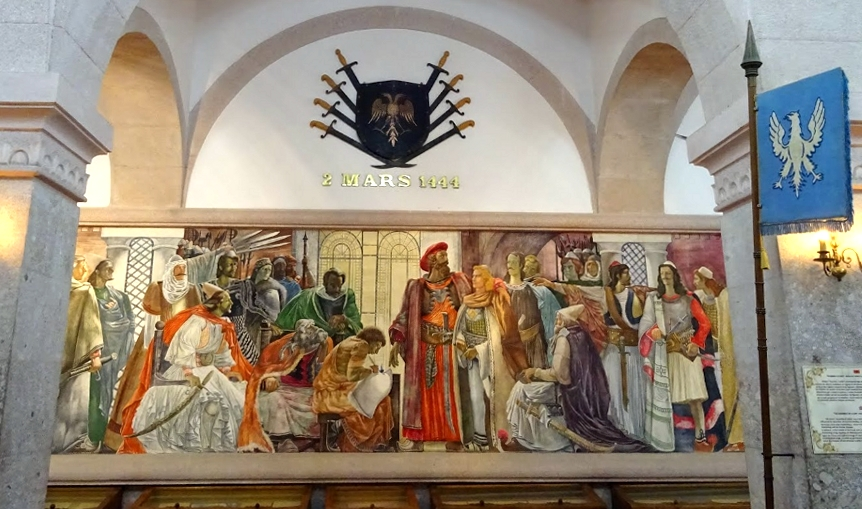
League of Lezhë painting in the Skanderbeg Museum in Krujë.

The gathering would be known as the League of Lezhë, with the nobles joining forces. Skanderbeg would be elected as the head of the league and the uprising against the Ottomans, beginning his rebellion. The lands of the prince's would be united under the League of Lezhë, however Skanderbeg had no say in their decisions about their own lands, rather serving more as a Primus inter pares

The first confrontation between the League of Lezhë and the Ottoman Empire would be on 29 June 1444 in the Plain of Torvioll, near Upper Dibra, when an army made up of 25,000 men led by Ali Pasha was defeated in battle by Skanderbeg.

== Sources ==
- Fine, John Van Antwerp (1994-06-15). The Late Medieval Balkans: A Critical Survey from the Late Twelfth Century to the Ottoman Conquest. University of Michigan Press. ISBN 978-0-472-08260-5.
