= Battle of Modrič =

1452 Albanian victory over the Ottomans

Battle of Modrič Beteja e Modriçit
- Part of the Albanian–Ottoman Wars (1432–1479)
| Date | 21 July 1452 |
| Location | Modrič, modern day North Macedonia |
| Result | Albanian victory |

Belligerents
| League of Lezhë | Ottoman Empire |

Commanders and leaders
| Skanderbeg; Hamza Kastrioti | Hamza Pasha (POW); Tahip Pasha |

Strength
| 14,000 | 10,000–12,000 |

The Battle of Modrič (Albanian: Beteja e Modriçit) was an important battle between Skanderbeg's forces and a joint force of Hamza Kastrioti and Tahip Pasha. Skanderbeg gathered 14,000 men and marched against Tahip Pasha's army. Skanderbeg planned to first defeat Hamza and then to move around Tahip and encircle him. Hamza had as many as 12,000 troops. men under his personal command and was camped near the new fortress of Modrič. Skanderbeg did not give Hamza much time to prepare and, on 21 July, he assaulted immediately. The fierce attack made short work of the Ottoman force, resulting in them fleeing. Much of the force fell on the field and the parts that ran away were pursued.

== Battle ==
After the death of Murat II, his son Mehmed II ascended the Ottoman throne (campaign in 1451–1481), who would not hesitate to send his forces against the Albanian free territories. Thus, in 1452, an Ottoman army of 12,000 men marched on the fortress of Modrica, on the banks of the Black Drin, which Skanderbeg had just erected. When Ottoman troops were climbing the hill to the castle of Modrica, they were attacked from above by the Albanians, and most were killed and taken prisoner along with their commander, Hamza Bey.

Hamza was captured in the battle as well as his staff. Francesco Sansovino, in Historia universale dell'origine et imperio de'Turchi, states that Hamza, fearing punitive measures, begged for mercy, arguing that he had only fought against Skanderbeg since he had been ordered to. According to Demetrio Franco, one of Skanderbeg's earliest biographers, Skanderbeg responded in such a way that the Ottoman officers began to cry and he offered to have dinner with them. After this, he ordered for his prisoners to be put under guard and to be treated properly.u01 The men were freed in the end, but Hamza and his staff were ransomed for 13,000 ducats. Franco reports that Skanderbeg's magnanimity became known throughout Albania and the Ottoman Empire to the point where many of his men gained much more respect for him as a warrior. Skanderbeg's intention in doing so was to show that he would not take advantage of the unfortunate and that he had enough confidence in his ability to let his enemies fight him again another day.
