= Liberation of Krujë (1443) =

Battle during 1443

Liberation of Krujë (1443) Çlirimi i Krujës
- Part of Skanderbeg's Albanian campaign and the Albanian–Ottoman Wars
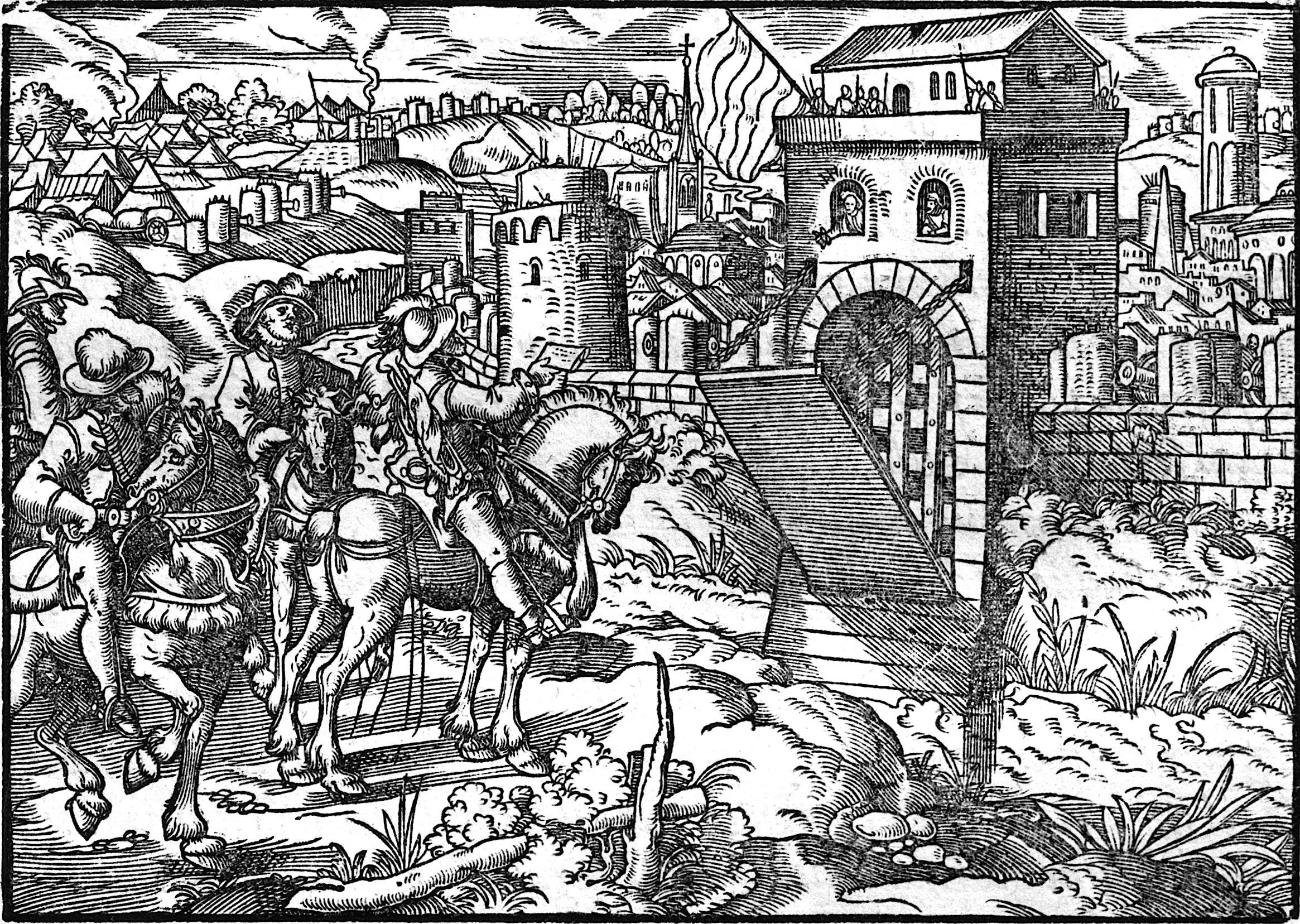
- Woodcut by Jost Amman depicting Skanderbeg's return to Krujë.
| Date | 28 November 1443 |
| Location | Krujë, Ottoman Albania, Ottoman Empire |
| Result | Albanian victory |
| Territorial changes | Krujë is captured by Albanian forces |

Belligerents
| Forces of Skanderbeg | Ottoman Empire |

Commanders and leaders
| Skanderbeg; Hamza Kastrioti | (Ottoman Empire) Zabel Pasha |

Strength
| 300 | Unknown |

Casualties and losses
| Unknown | All killed |

The Liberation of Krujë (Albanian: Çlirimi i Krujës) was the capture of the city of Krujë from the Ottoman Empire by Skanderbeg on 28 November 1443. It marks the start of Skanderbeg's rebellion and is an important event in Albanian history.

== Background ==
According to Chalcocondyles, "Weary after Hunyadi forced the Ottomans to retreat in the Balkans in 1443, the old lords hurried on all sides to regain possession of their fathers' fields". One of them was Gjergj Kastrioti Skanderbeg, who deserted the Ottoman army along with his nephew Hamza Kastrioti and 300 other Albanians, which were placed on the left flank of the Ottoman army, but retreated without engaging Hunyadi.

After a seven day march, Skanderbeg reached the city of Dibra which was ruled by Moisi Golemi. When he entered, Skanderbeg was applauded by the local Albanians. He would then form a small government in the city which would "lay the foundation" of an anti-Ottoman rebellion. Hundreds of local Dibran fighters would be placed on the roads leading to the city to block Ottoman armies, while Skanderbeg began his march to Kruja.

== Battle ==
On 28 November 1443, Skanderbeg's 300 soldiers reached the city of Krujë. Skanderbeg hid his soldiers in the woods as Hamza Kastrioti made his way to the entrance of the castle, handing over a forged letter from the Sultan to its leader, Zabel Pasha, which stated that Skanderbeg was to be appointed the new ruler of the castle. After Zabel Pasha left the castle, Skanderbeg entered it together with his 300 Albanian soldiers. When it became nighttime, the Albanian forces attacked the Ottoman guards, picking them off one-by-one. The remaining Ottoman guards asked for mercy, leading to Skanderbeg asking for an ultimatum, in which the Ottomans were to leave the city. However, some of them didn't accept and charged at the Albanian soldiers, but they were quickly killed. Skanderbeg let the remaining Ottomans escape, however, as soon as they left the castle walls, they were killed by mobs of Albanian civilians, with no Ottoman guard being left alive. After the end of the clash, Skanderbeg gave a speech where he stated:

I did not bring you freedom, I found it here among you. As soon as I set foot here, as soon as you heard my name, all of you came to me faster, as if your fathers, brothers and sons had risen from the graves, as if God himself had descended from heaven.

== Aftermath ==
After liberating Krujë, Skanderbeg, together with the help of the Dibran forces led by Moisi Golemi, captured many other Albanian castles that were under the rule of the Ottomans, one of the most crucial ones being the castle of Svetigrad. On 2 March 1444, the regional Albanian chieftains and nobles united against the Ottoman Empire and established the League of Lezhë.

== Sources ==
- Noli, Fan Stilian (1947), George Castrioti Scanderbeg (1405-1468), International Universities Press, OCLC 732882
