= Battle of Otonetë =

1446 battle in the Balkans

Battle of Otonetë Beteja e Otonetës
- Part of the Albanian–Ottoman Wars (1432–1479)
Date	September 27, 1446
Location	Otonetë, Upper Debar, modern-day Macedonia 41.5166°N 20.5333°E
Result	Albanian victory

Belligerents
League of Lezhë	Ottoman Empire

Commanders and leaders
Skanderbeg; Lekë Dukagjini	(Ottoman Empire) Mustafa Pasha

Strength
5,000	15,000 cavalry in the campaign; unknown number during the battle

Casualties and losses
Unknown	5,000 killed 300 taken prisoner
- Location within Albania

The Battle of Otonetë (Albanian: Beteja e Otonetës) occurred on September 27, 1446, in upper Dibra in Albania. The Ottoman commander, Mustafa Pasha, was sent into Albania, but was soon intercepted and defeated by Skanderbeg. It was one of the many victories won by Skanderbeg.

== Background ==
Soon after Skanderbeg united the Albanian princes in 1443, the Ottoman Empire sent forces to quell the rebellion. The first army to be sent was defeated in 1444 at Torvioll. Another force was sent one year later but was again defeated by Skanderbeg at Mokra. After establishing diplomatic relations with many major European powers, Murad II resumed his campaign to crush all remaining resistance in the Balkans.

== Prelude and battle ==
As Murad prepared his forces to launch a campaign against Hunyadi, who was in that year proclaimed regent of Hungary, he sent a force of 15,000 cavalry under Mustafa Pasha into Albania. The Turkish plan was to fight a war of attrition, pillaging the land and inflicting terror on the population, while avoiding pitched battle. Mustafa split his force into two and sent one contingent into combat while keeping the other in a fortified position: Otonetë. When Skanderbeg learned that the Ottoman army was split, he attacked Otonetë with 5,000 men. The camp was set in disorder as the Albanians pierced through, "turning it into a slaughterhouse".

== Aftermath ==
5,000 Ottoman soldiers fell and 300 were made prisoners. The whole camp and its supplies fell into Skanderbeg's hands. After this defeat, Murad ordered Mustafa to defend the border and to not perform any actions which may cause another defeat.
