= Ajdin Muzaka =

15th-century Albanian commander and nobleman

Co-Prince of Muzaka Ajdin Muzaka
- Died: 1445
- Cause of death: Wounded in the Battle of Torvioll
- Spouse: Angelina Kastrioti
- Military career
- Rank: Military Commander
- Unit: League of Lezhë

Ajdin Muzaka (? - 1445) was the brother in law of Gjergj Kastrioti (Skanderbeg) and one of his commanders. He was converted to Islam and served in Ottoman army before joining Skanderbeg's rebellion. He was the commander of the central group in the Battle of Torvioll and he played a crucial role in the Albanian victory. He was wounded in that battle and died soon afterwards. He was known for his extreme courage and was the first high-rank Albanian commander who died in Skanderbeg's battles against Ottoman forces.
