= Albanian–Ottoman Wars (1432–1479) =

Revolts by Albanian feudal lords

Albanian–Ottoman Wars (1432–1479) Luftërat shqiptaro-osmane
- Part of the Ottoman wars in Europe
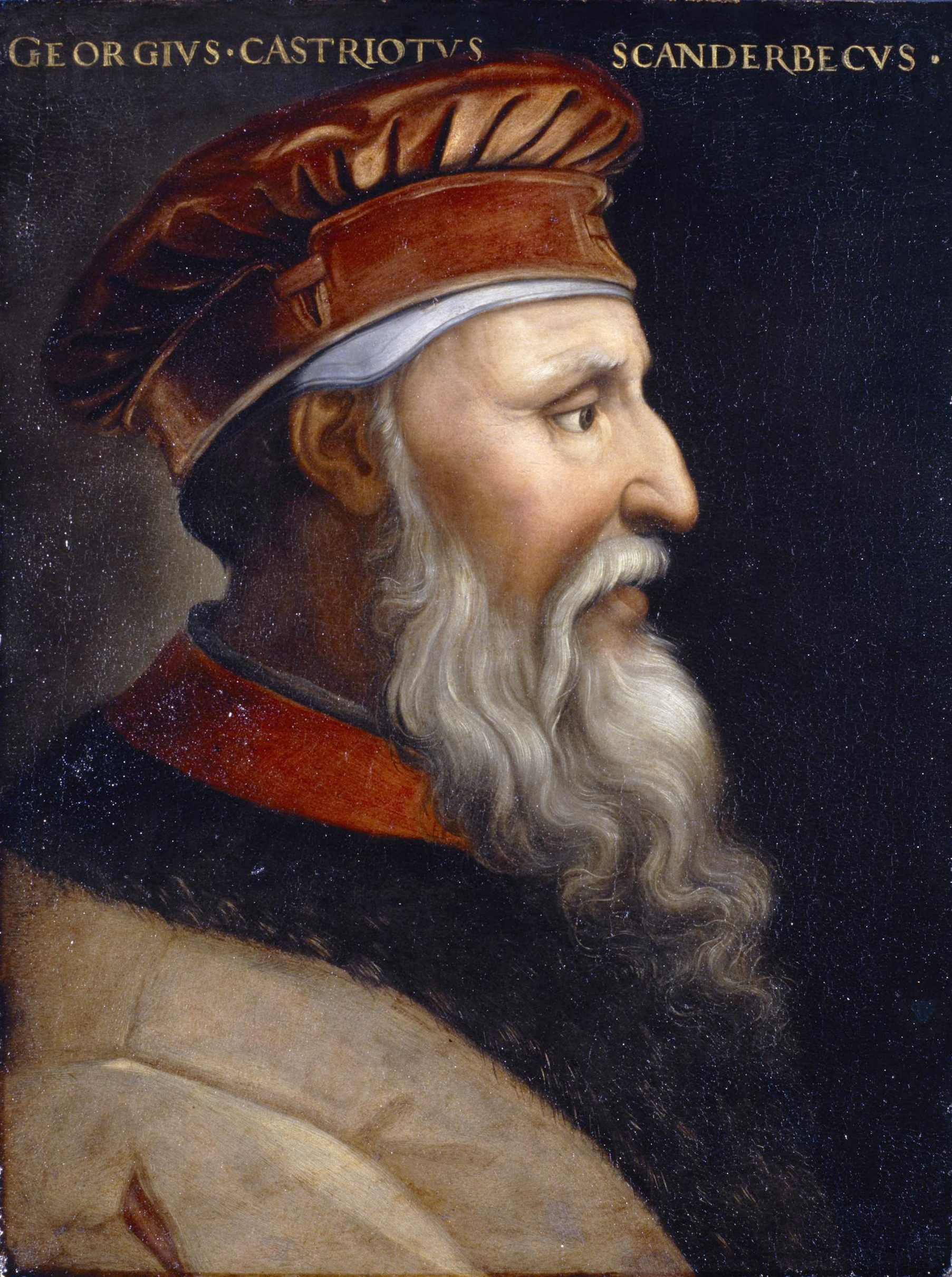
- Gjergj Kastrioti Skanderbeg
| Date | 1432 – 25 April 1479 |
| Location | League of Lezhë, Sanjak of Albania |
| Result | Ottoman victory |
| Territorial changes | The Ottoman Empire conquered most of Albania, with the northern regions retaining autonomy. |

Belligerents
| League of Lezhë | Ottoman Empire |

Commanders and leaders
| Skanderbeg #; Vrana Konti; Hamza Kastrioti (until 1456); Moisi Golemi (executed); Vladan Jurica (executed); Gjergj Arianiti; Gjon Kastrioti; Lekë Dukagjini; Nicholas Dukagjini; Ivan Crnojević; Andrea Thopia | Murad II #; Mehmed II; Ballaban Pasha †; Ishak Bey; Hamza Kastrioti (POW) (from 1456); Firuz Pasha †; Ali Pasha; Moisi Golemi (1455–1456); Ali Bey; Turahan Bey; Gedik Ahmed Pasha |

The Albanian–Ottoman Wars (1432–1479) were a series of wars and revolts against the rising Ottoman Empire by Albanian feudal lords. The wars and revolts took place in present-day Albania, Montenegro, Kosovo, North Macedonia and South Serbia. In this period, Albanians under the leadership of Gjergj Arianiti and especially later under Skanderbeg resisted the Ottomans under two Sultans. Skanderbeg continued this resistance until his death in 1468, and the Albanians persevered for another 11 years before being defeated.

== History ==
=== Background ===
The Sanjak of Albania in 1431

During the late 14th and early 15th century the Ottoman Empire gradually defeated local Albanian principalities, forming the sanjak of Albania as an administrative division of the empire. As part of the Timar system the local feudal lords were largely replaced with Ottomans from Anatolia. The cadastral survey (defter) of 1431–1432 indicates that about 75% to 80% of the timars were granted to Ottoman Muslim spahis (feudal cavalry), while the remainder and especially remote areas, which were not under full Ottoman control, were granted to Albanian spahis, both Christian and Muslim. The replacement of the existing nobility with the timar system led to conflicts, as a result of which many rural areas were not under complete Ottoman rule.

Under the previous taxation code, farmers were required to pay a tenth of their seasonal agricultural output, 1 ducat and 4 groshe (two-ninths of a ducat) to their lords. The Ottoman system aimed at increasing revenues to support military expenses, thus new taxes were imposed and existing ones were altered. In addition to 1/10 of agrarian production Muslim families were required to pay 10001 leke (~0.6 ducats) to the timar holders, while non-Muslim families had to pay 30 leke (~0.7 ducats). Both groups were subject to additional taxes including the avarız, an annual cash tax that affected households registered to the cadasters. Non-Muslims were also required to pay 45 akçe (~1.3 ducats) as part of the jizya and had to supply regularly the Ottoman state with young recruits in accordance with the devşirme, which required the enlistment of young males in the Ottoman army and their conversion to Islam.

Consequently, the changes in property rights, relations between feudal lords and peasants, the taxation system and the enactment of devşirme resulted in further resistance. As changes affecting both nobles and peasants were principally implemented through registration in the cadastral survey, many families tried to avoid becoming registered in the 1431–2 survey and took refugee in mountainous areas, while the nobility prepared for armed conflict.

=== Revolt of 1432–36 ===
The revolt was prompted by the replacement of large parts of the local nobility with Ottoman landowners, centralized governance and the Ottoman taxation system, the population and the nobles, led principally by Gjergj Arianiti, revolted against the Ottomans. The revolt began in 1432 when Andrea Thopia defeated a small Ottoman force in central Albania. His victory encouraged the other leaders and the revolt spread throughout Albania. Later that year the Ottomans lost control of the central seaport of Vlorë. Gjergj Arianiti, who was living at the Ottoman court as a hostage, was called by rebels to lead the revolt in his family's domains. In response, he fled from Edirne and returned to Albania. In the winter of 1432, Sultan Murat II gathered around 10.000 troops under Ali Bey, who marched along the Via Egnatia and reached the central valley of Shkumbin, where he was ambushed and defeated by forces under Gjergj Arianiti.

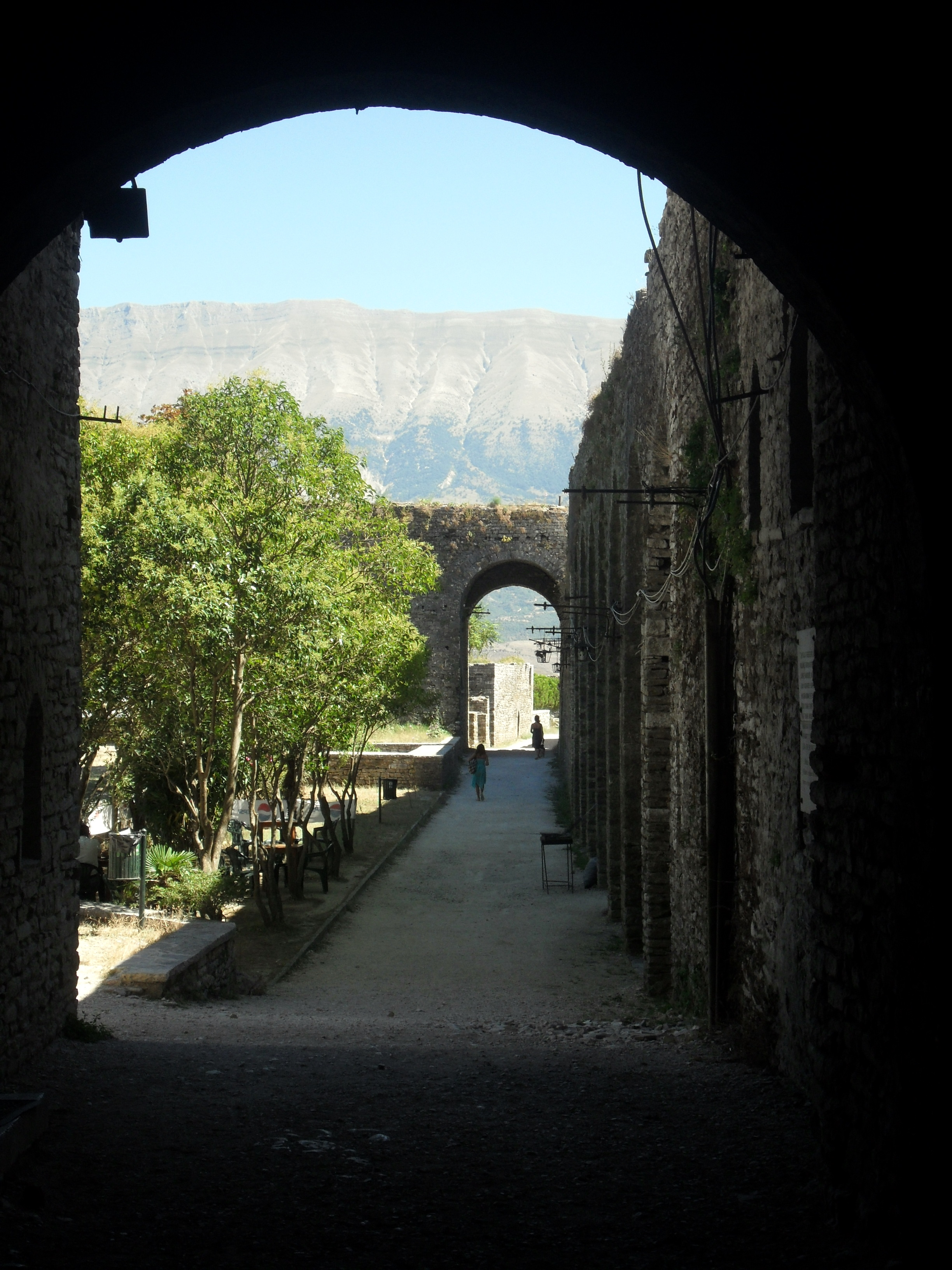
The castle of Gjirokastër was besieged by Depë Zenebishi, who was defeated by Turahan Bey

His victory prompted the Albanians in the area of Gjirokastër to call upon Depë Zenebishi, who had settled in his estates in Corfu after the Ottoman conquest of the Principality of Gjirokastër, to lead the rebels in the south. After spreading the revolt in nearby areas including Këlcyrë, Zagorie and Pogon his forces besieged the southern city of Gjirokastër, capital of the sanjak of Albania. At nearby Këlcyrë the rebels captured the castle, but the concurrent siege of Gjirokastër was prolonged and Turahan Bey attacked and defeated the troops that surrounded the city in early 1433. Zenebishi himself was captured and executed.

Standard of Principality of Albania in the Middle Ages

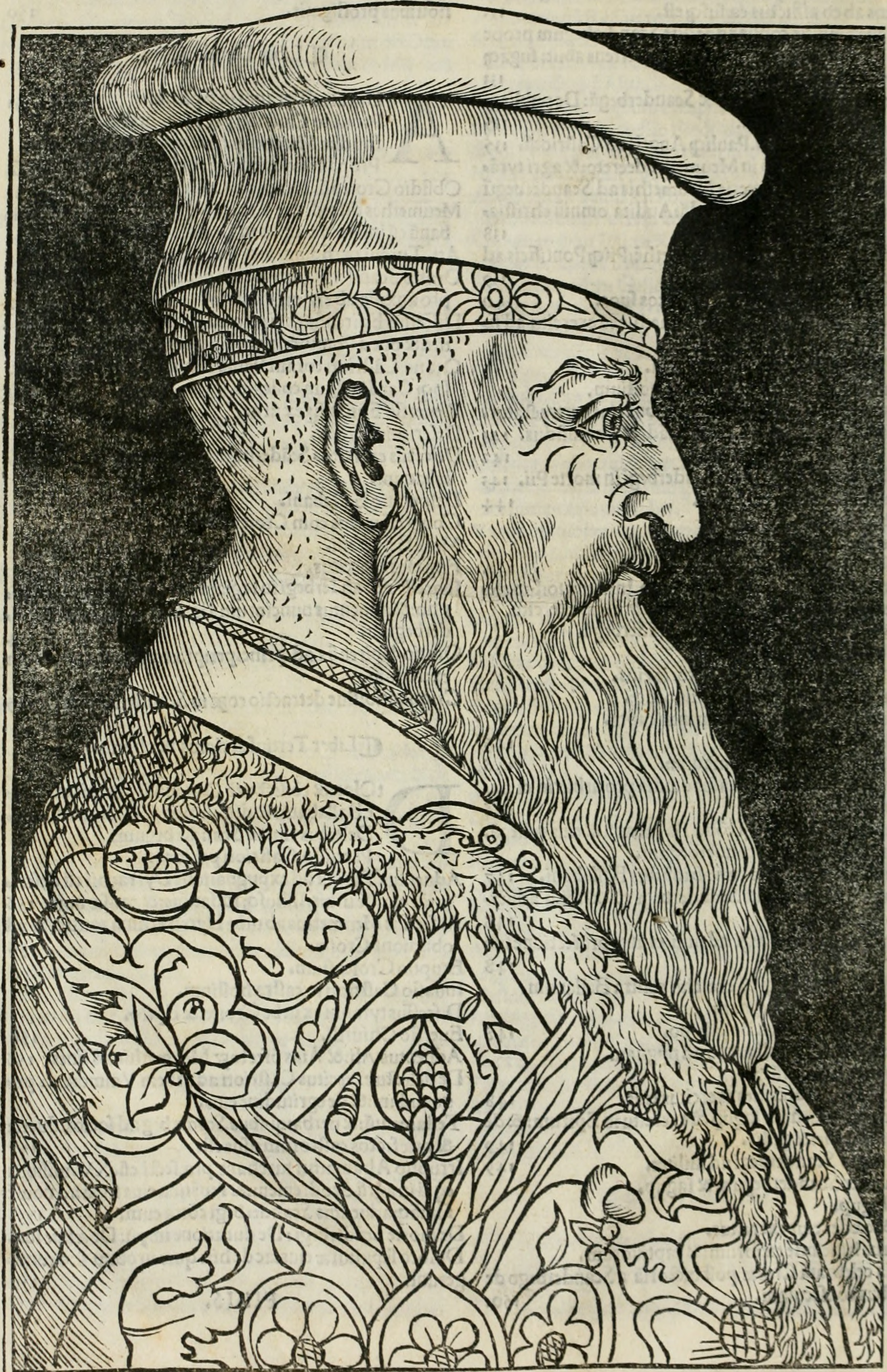
Skanderbeg from the biography of Marin Barleti (1508)

In the summer of 1433 an army led by Sinan Pasha, beylerbey of Rumelia, pillaged the areas of Kanina and Yannina and moved northwards, where they subdued the rebels in the domains of Gjon Kastrioti, who was reduced again to vassal status, while his son Skanderbeg, who was also called to join the revolt, remained in Ottoman service in Anatolia. In August 1433, the senate of Venice convened to evaluate the situation and deemed that the revolt posed a threat to the Venetian territories in the region too. However, by the end of October they reevaluated the crisis and rejected the deployment of a war galley to the Venetian colonies. In northern Albania Nicholas Dukagjini captured territories of the pre-Ottoman Principality of Dukagjini and besieged and captured Dagnum. Dukagjini then tried to ally himself with Venice by offering to accept Venetian suzerainty and granting them control of Dagnum. However, Venice refused any kind of involvement in his plan and the revolt in general. Dukagjini was not aware that Hasan Bey, the Ottoman governor of Dagnum, had requested Venetian assistance after his defeat. As Venice did not want to provoke Ottoman hostility, the captain of Shkodër (Scutari) was ordered to assist Hasan Bey in recapturing Dagnum. Arms were subsequently sent to the garrison of Lezhë (Alessio) and by 1435 the fort had been returned to Ottoman control. In central Albania, Andrea Thopia unsuccessfully besieged the castle of Krujë, while in the region of Vlorë the siege of the fort of Kaninë began. Vlorë was lost to the rebels as early as May 1432, but must have been recovered by May 1434 as contemporary Venetian documents mention an Ottoman official (subaşi) stationed there at that time.

Another Ottoman army was assembled in Manastir in the summer of 1434. Again under the command of Sinan Pasha, this Ottoman expedition was defeated by Gjergj Arianiti in south-central Albania in August 1434. After his defeat, all beys of the territories bordering Albania were ordered to gather their forces and attack the rebels. In December 1434 Ishak Bey, sanjakbey of Üsküb marched into south-central Albania but was defeated by Gjergj Arianiti. Contemporary sources from the senate of Ragusa mention that many Ottoman soldiers were captured, while Ishak Bey escaped with a small group. In April 1435, Arianiti defeated another Ottoman campaign and hostilities virtually ceased until the beginning of 1436, as Murat II's military efforts were focused against Ibrahim of Karaman in Anatolia. At the end of 1435 reports of the Ragusan senate assessed the situation as calm and noted that the belligerents had retreated to their respective territories.

During the revolt many attempts were made to form an anti-Ottoman coalition including the Holy Roman Empire. Pope Eugene IV requested troops to be sent to assist the revolt and tried to gather funds. In 1435, Holy Roman Emperor Sigismund of Luxemburg sent Fruzhin, a Bulgarian nobleman, and in early 1436 Daud, a pretender to the Ottoman throne, to negotiate the possibility of a coalition with the rebels. However, by mid-1436 a large force under Turahan Bey had been assembled. Despite the military victories the rebel leaders acted autonomously without a central leadership, the lack of which contributed greatly to their final defeat. Turahan's forces eventually subdued the revolt and marched through Albania, committing widespread massacres of civilians.

After the revolt had largely been suppressed, those who accepted Ottoman suzerainty were initially allowed to retain their holdings and partial autonomy. Many timars were also granted to local Albanians holding high posts of the administration, especially during the rule of Yakup Bey Muzaka and Skanderbeg. Throughout the pacification process, various primarily rural areas were still in revolt and new rebellions erupted, like that of Theodor Corona Musachi in 1437. As the empire further extended its area of rule in the Balkans, centralization attempts and the replacement of local timar holders with Ottoman landowners resumed. These policies would lead in part to the formation of the League of Lezhë under Skanderbeg in 1444, and a new era in the Ottoman–Albanian wars.

=== Skanderbeg's rebellion ===
==== Rise ====
In early November 1443, Skanderbeg deserted the forces of Sultan Murad II during the Battle of Niš, while fighting against the crusaders of John Hunyadi. According to some earlier sources, Skanderbeg deserted the Ottoman army during the Battle of Kunovica on 2 January 1444. Skanderbeg quit the field along with 300 other Albanians serving in the Ottoman army. He immediately led his men to Krujë, where he arrived on 28 November, and by the use of a forged letter from Sultan Murad to the Governor of Krujë he became lord of the city that very day. To reinforce his intention of gaining control of the former domains of Zeta, Skanderbeg proclaimed himself the heir of the Balšić family. After capturing some less important surrounding castles (Petrela, Prezë, Guri i Bardhë, Svetigrad, Modrič, and others) he raised, according to Frashëri, a red standard with a black double-headed eagle on Krujë (Albania uses a similar flag as its national symbol to this day). Skanderbeg abandoned Islam, reverted to Christianity, and ordered others who had embraced Islam or were Muslim colonists to convert to Christianity or face death. From that time on, the Ottomans referred to Skanderbeg as "hain (treacherous) İskender". The small court of Skanderbeg consisted of persons of various ethnicities. Ninac Vukosalić, a Serb, was the dijak ("scribe", secretary) and chancellor at the court. He was also the manager of Skanderbeg's bank account in Ragusa. Members of the Gazulli family had important roles in diplomacy, finance, and purchase of arms. John Gazulli, a doctor, was sent to the court of king Matthias Corvinus to coordinate the offensive against Mehmed II. The knight Pal Gazulli was travelling frequently to Italy, and another Gazulli, Andrea, was ambassador of the despot of Morea in Ragusa before becoming a member of Skanderbeg's court in 1462. Some adventurers also followed Skanderbeg, such as a certain John Newport, a Stefan Maramonte, ambassador of Skanderbeg in Milan in 1456, a certain Stjepan Radojevic, who in 1466 provided ships for a trip to Split, a certain Ruscus from Cattaro, and others. The Ragusan Gondola/Gundulić merchant family had a role similar to Gazulli. Correspondence was written in Slavic, Greek, Latin, and Italian. Documents in Latin were written by notaries from Italy or Venetian territories in Albania.

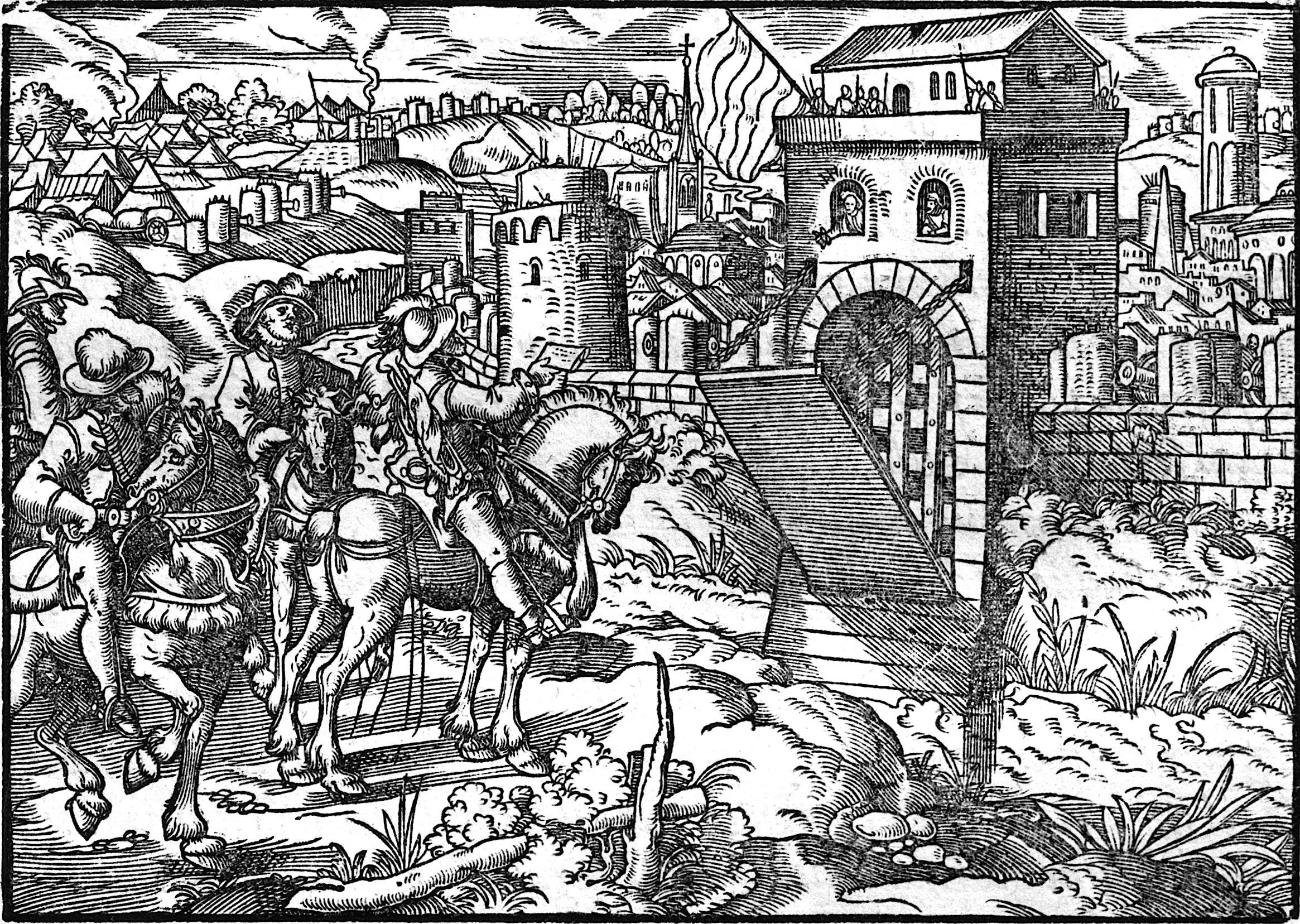
Skanderbeg's return to Krujë, 1444 (woodcut by Jost Amman)

In Albania, the rebellion against the Ottomans had already been smouldering for years before Skanderbeg deserted the Ottoman army. In August 1443, George Arianiti again revolted against the Ottomans in the region of central Albania. Under Venetian patronage, on 2 March 1444, Skanderbeg summoned Albanian noblemen in the Venetian-controlled town of Lezhë and they established a military alliance known in historiography as the League of Lezhë. Among those who joined the military alliance were the powerful Albanian noble families of Arianiti, Dukagjini, Muzaka, Zaharia, Thopia, Zenevisi, Dushmani and Spani, and also the Serbian nobleman Stefan Crnojević of Zeta.

Skanderbeg organized a mobile defense army that forced the Ottomans to disperse their troops, leaving them vulnerable to the hit-and-run tactics of the Albanians. Skanderbeg fought a guerrilla war against the opposing armies by using the mountainous terrain to his advantage. During the first 8–10 years, Skanderbeg commanded an army of generally 10,000–15,000 soldiers, but only had absolute control over the men from his own dominions, and had to convince the other princes to follow his policies and tactics. Skanderbeg occasionally had to pay tribute to the Ottomans, but only in exceptional circumstances, such as during the war with the Venetians or his travel to Italy and perhaps when he was under pressure of Ottoman forces that were too strong.

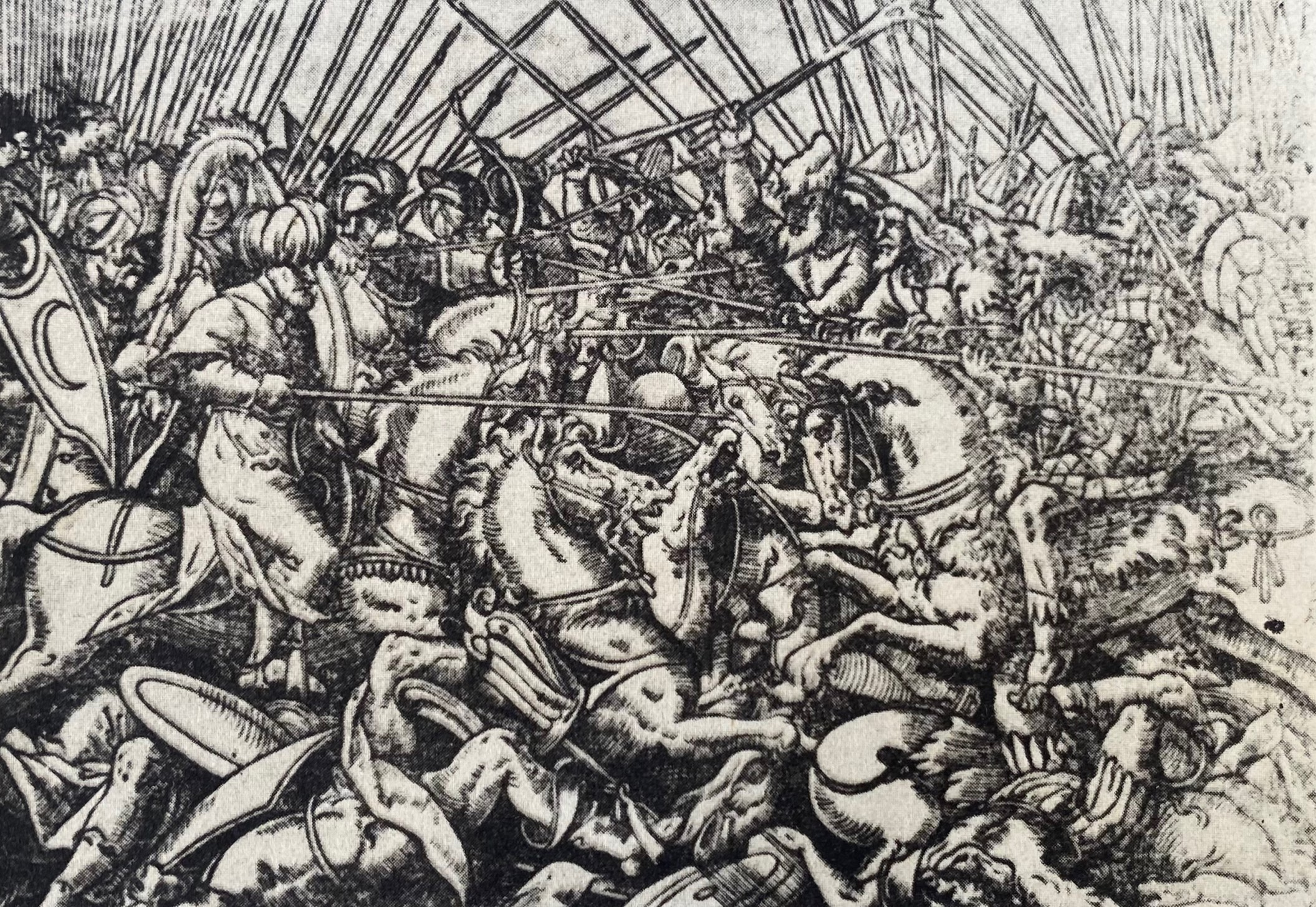
A woodcut of the battle of Varna in 1444

In the summer of 1444, in the Plain of Torvioll, the united Albanian armies under Skanderbeg faced the Ottomans who were under direct command of the Ottoman general Ali Pasha, with an army of 25,000 men. Skanderbeg had under his command 7,000 infantry and 8,000 cavalry. 3,000 cavalry were hidden behind enemy lines in a nearby forest under the command of Hamza Kastrioti. At a given signal, they descended, encircled the Ottomans, and gave Skanderbeg a much needed victory. About 8,000 Ottomans were killed and 2,000 were captured. Skanderbeg's first victory echoed across Europe because this was one of the few times that an Ottoman army was defeated in a pitched battle on European soil.

Kenneth Meyer Setton claims that majority of accounts on Skanderbeg's activities in the period 1443–1444 "owe far more to fancy than to fact." Soon after Skanderbeg captured Krujë using the forged letter to take control from Zabel Pasha, his rebels managed to capture many Ottoman fortresses including strategically very important Svetigrad (Kodžadžik) taken with support of Moisi Arianit Golemi and 3,000 rebels from Debar. According to some sources, Skanderbeg impaled captured Ottoman officials who refused to be baptized into Christianity.

The first battle of Skanderbeg's rebels against the Ottomans was fought on 10 October 1445, on mountain Mokra. According to Setton, after Skanderbeg was allegedly victorious in the Battle of Torvioll, the Hungarians are said to have sung praises about him and urged Skanderbeg to join the alliance of Hungary, the Papacy and Burgundy against the Ottomans. In the spring of 1446, using help of Ragusan diplomats, Skanderbeg requested support from the Pope and Kingdom of Hungary for his struggle against the Ottomans.

On 10 October 1445, an Ottoman force of 9,000–15,000 men under Firuz Pasha was sent to prevent Skanderbeg from moving into Macedonia. Firuz had heard that the Albanian army had disbanded for the time being, so he planned to move quickly around the Black Drin valley and through Prizren. These movements were picked up by Skanderbeg's scouts, who moved to meet Firuz. The Ottomans were lured into the Mokra valley, and Skanderbeg with a force of 3,500 attacked and defeated the Ottomans. Firuz was killed along with 1,500 of his men. Skanderbeg defeated the Ottomans two more times the following year, once when Ottoman forces from Ohrid suffered severe losses, and again in the Battle of Otonetë on 27 September 1446.

=== War with Venice 1447 to 1448 ===
At the beginning of the Albanian insurrection, the Republic of Venice was supportive of Skanderbeg, considering his forces to be a buffer between them and the Ottoman Empire. Lezhë, where the eponymous league was established, was Venetian territory, and the assembly met with the approval of Venice. The later affirmation of Skanderbeg and his rise as a strong force on their borders, however, was seen as a menace to the interests of the Republic, leading to a worsening of relations and the dispute over the fortress of Dagnum which triggered the Albanian-Venetian War of 1447–48. After various attacks against Bar and Ulcinj, along with Đurađ Branković and Stefan Crnojević, and Albanians of the area, the Venetians offered rewards for his assassination. The Venetians sought by every means to overthrow Skanderbeg or bring about his death, even offering a life pension of 100 golden ducats annually for the person who would kill him. During the conflict, Venice invited the Ottomans to attack Skanderbeg simultaneously from the east, facing the Albanians with a two-front conflict.

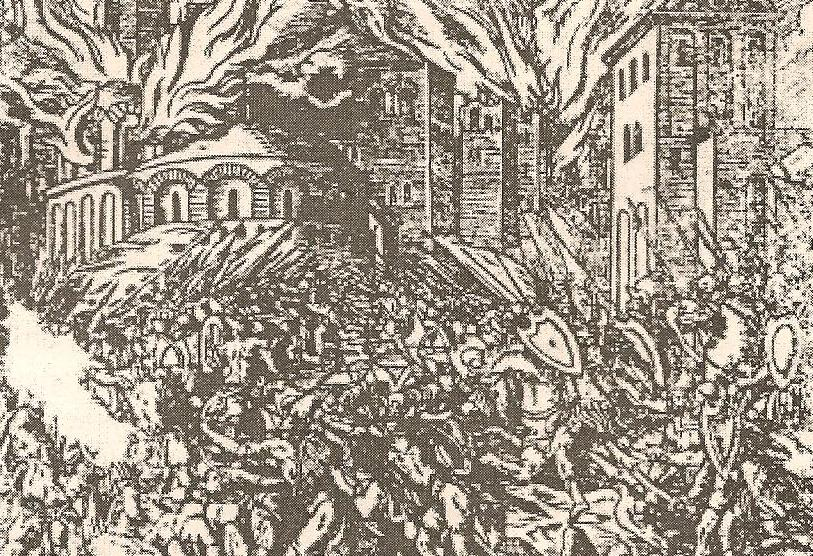
Woodcut depicting an engagement between Albanian and Ottoman forces

On 14 May 1448, an Ottoman army led by Sultan Murad II and his son Mehmed laid siege to the castle of Svetigrad. The Albanian garrison in the castle resisted the frontal assaults of the Ottoman army, while Skanderbeg harassed the besieging forces with the remaining Albanian army under his personal command. On 23 July 1448, Skanderbeg won a battle near Shkodër against a Venetian army led by Andrea Venier. In late summer 1448, due to a lack of potable water, the Albanian garrison eventually surrendered the castle with the condition of safe passage through the Ottoman besieging forces, a condition which was accepted and respected by Sultan Murad II. Primary sources disagree about the reason why the besieged had problems with the water in the castle: While Barleti and Biemmi maintained that a dead dog was found in the castle well, and the garrison refused to drink the water since it might corrupt their soul, another primary source, an Ottoman chronicler, conjectured that the Ottoman forces found and cut the water sources of the castle. Recent historians mostly concur with the Ottoman chronicler's version. Although his loss of men was minimal, Skanderbeg lost the castle of Svetigrad, which was an important stronghold that controlled the fields of Macedonia to the east. At the same time, he besieged the towns of Durazzo (modern Durrës) and Lezhë which were then under Venetian rule. In August 1448, Skanderbeg defeated Mustafa Pasha in Dibër at the battle of Oranik. Mustafa Pasha lost 3,000 men and was captured, along with twelve high officers. Skanderbeg learned from these officers that it was the Venetians who pushed the Ottomans to invade Albania. The Venetians, upon hearing of the defeat, urged to establish peace. Mustafa Pasha was soon ransomed for 25,000 ducats to the Ottomans.

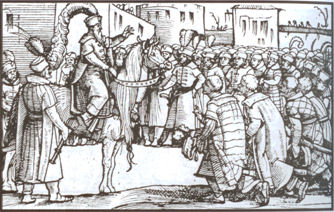
Skanderbeg addressing the people, 16th-century engraving by Jost Amman

On 23 July 1448 Skanderbeg crossed the Drin River with 10,000 men, meeting a Venetian force of 15,000 men under the command of Daniele Iurichi, governor of Scutari. Skanderbeg instructed his troops on what to expect and opened battle by ordering a force of archers to open fire on the Venetian line. The battle continued for hours until large groups of Venetian troops began to flee. Skanderbeg, seeing his fleeing adversaries, ordered a full-scale offensive, routing the entire Venetian army. The Republic's soldiers were chased right to the gates of Scutari, and Venetian prisoners were thereafter paraded outside the fortress. The Albanians managed to inflict 2,500 casualties on the Venetian force, capturing 1,000. Skanderbeg's army suffered 400 casualties, most on the right wing. The peace treaty, negotiated by Georgius Pelino and signed between Skanderbeg and Venice on 4 October 1448, envisioned that Venice would keep Dagnum and its environs, but would cede to Skanderbeg the territory of Buzëgjarpri at the mouth of the river Drin, and also that Skanderbeg would enjoy the privilege of buying, tax-free, 200 horse-loads of salt annually from Durazzo. In addition Venice would pay Skanderbeg 1,400 ducats. During the period of clashes with Venice, Skanderbeg intensified relations with Alfonso V of Aragon (r. 1416–1458), who was the main rival of Venice in the Adriatic, where his dreams for an empire were always opposed by the Venetians.

One of the reasons Skanderbeg agreed to sign the peace treaty with Venice was the advance of John Hunyadi's army in Kosovo and his invitation for Skanderbeg to join the expedition against the sultan. However, the Albanian army under Skanderbeg did not participate in this battle as he was prevented from joining with Hunyadi's army. It is believed that he was delayed by Đurađ Branković, then allied with Sultan Murad II, although Brankovic's exact role is disputed. As a result, Skanderbeg ravaged his domains as a punishment for the desertion of the Christian cause. He appears to have marched to join Hunyadi immediately after making peace with the Venetians, and to have been only 20 miles from Kosovo Polje when the Hungarian army finally broke.

=== Italian expedition 1460 to 1462 ===
Skanderbeg's military expedition to Italy 1460—1462. The Northern route was taken by himself, whereas the southern one was taken by his subordinates.

In 1457, Skanderbeg had achieved his most famous victory over the Ottoman Empire at Albulena (Ujëbardha), which was received with great enthusiasm throughout Italy. In order to repay Alfonso for the financial and military assistance given to him years before, Skanderbeg took up the pope's pleas to help out Alfonso's son by sending a military expedition to Italy. Before leaving, Skanderbeg tried to negotiate a ceasefire with Sultan Mehmed II, the conqueror of Constantinople, to ensure his domain's safety. Mehmed had not declared a truce and he was still sending his armies against Bosnia and the Morea. It was not until 1459, after Mehmed's conquest of Serbia, that Mehmed not only declared a truce, but also a three-year ceasefire with Skanderbeg. This gave Skanderbeg his opportunity to send his men to Italy.

Due to fears of an approaching Ottoman army, Skanderbeg first sent his nephew, Constantine, with 500 cavalry to Barletta. They were incorporated into Ferdinand's forces to combat his Angevin rivals. They held back their enemy for a year, but did not gain much ground until Skanderbeg arrived in September 1461. Before reaching Italy, Skanderbeg visited Ragusa (Dubrovnik) to convince its rectors to help fund his campaign. Meanwhile, his men landed in Italy and Angevin forces lifted their siege on Barletta. Upon arriving, Skanderbeg continued to pursue his ally's enemies with great success. Ferdinand's adversaries thus began to retreat from his territories and Skanderbeg went back to Albania; a troop of his men stayed until Ferdinand managed to finally defeat the pretenders to his throne at the Battle of Orsara, although it is not known if Skanderbeg's men participated.

In 1460, King Ferdinand had serious problems with another uprising of the Angevins and asked for help from Skanderbeg. This invitation worried King Ferdinand's opponents, and Sigismondo Pandolfo Malatesta declared that if Ferdinand of Naples received Skanderbeg, Malatesta would go to the Ottomans. In the month of September 1460, Skanderbeg dispatched a company of 500 cavalry under his nephew, Ivan Strez Balšić.

"The Prince of Taranto wrote me a letter, a copy of which, and the reply I made him, I am sending to Your Majesty. I am very surprised that His Lordship should think to turn me from my intention by his brusque words, and I should like to say one thing: may God guard Your Majesty from ill and harm and danger, but however things may turn out I am the friend of virtue and not fortune."

— Skanderbeg's letter to Ferdinand I of Naples.

Ferdinand's main rival Prince of Taranto Giovanni Antonio Orsini tried to dissuade Skanderbeg from this enterprise and even offered him an alliance. This did not affect Skanderbeg, who answered on 31 October 1460, that he owed fealty to the Aragon family, especially in times of hardship. In his response to Orsini, Skanderbeg mentioned that the Albanians never betray their friends, and that they are the descendants of Pyrrhus of Epirus, and reminded Orsini of Pyrrhus' victories in southern Italy. When the situation became critical, Skanderbeg made a three-year armistice with the Ottomans on 17 April 1461, and in late August 1461, landed in Apulia with an expeditionary force of 1,000 cavalry and 2,000 infantry. At Barletta and Trani, he managed to defeat the Italian and Angevin forces of Orsini of Taranto, secured King Ferdinand's throne, and returned to Albania. King Ferdinand was grateful to Skanderbeg for this intervention for the rest of his life: at Skanderbeg's death, he rewarded his descendants with the castle of Trani, and the properties of Monte Sant'Angelo and San Giovanni Rotondo.

=== Siege of Krujë (1450) and its aftermath ===
In June 1450, two years after the Ottomans had captured Svetigrad, they laid siege to Krujë with an army numbering approximately 100,000 men and led again by Sultan Murad II himself and his son, Mehmed II. Following a scorched earth strategy (thus denying the Ottomans the use of necessary local resources), Skanderbeg left a protective garrison of 1,500 men under one of his most trusted lieutenants, Vrana Konti, while, with the remainder of the army, which included many Slavs, Germans, Frenchmen and Italians, he harassed the Ottoman camps around Krujë by continuously attacking Sultan Murad II's supply caravans. The garrison repelled three major direct assaults on the city walls by the Ottomans, causing great losses to the besieging forces. Ottoman attempts at finding and cutting the water sources failed, as did a sapped tunnel, which collapsed suddenly. An offer of 300,000 aspra (Ottoman silver coins) and a promise of a high rank as an officer in the Ottoman army made to Vrana Konti, were both rejected by him.

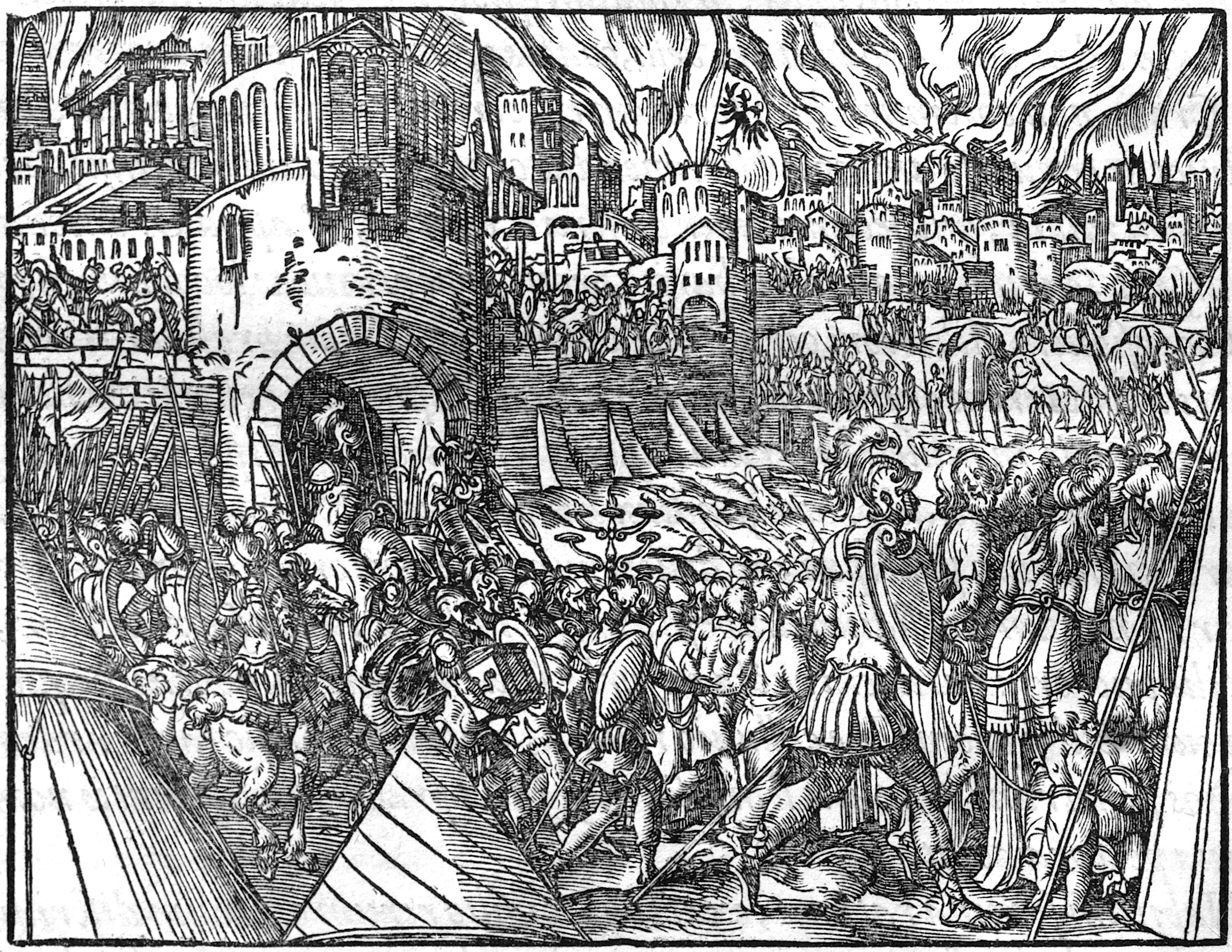
First Siege of Krujë, 1450, woodcut by Jost Amman

During the First Siege of Krujë, the Venetian merchants from Scutari sold food to the Ottoman army and those of Durazzo supplied Skanderbeg's army. An angry attack by Skanderbeg on the Venetian caravans raised tension between him and the Republic, but the case was resolved with the help of the bailo of Durazzo who stopped the Venetian merchants from any longer furnishing the Ottomans. Venetians' help to the Ottomans notwithstanding, by September 1450, the Ottoman camp was in disarray, as the castle was still not taken, the morale had sunk, and disease was running rampant. Murad II acknowledged that he could not capture the castle of Krujë by force of arms before the winter, and in October 1450, he lifted the siege and made his way to Edirne. The Ottomans suffered 20,000 casualties during the siege, and many more died as Murad escaped Albania. A few months later, on 3 February 1451, Murad died in Edirne and was succeeded by his son Mehmed II (r. 1451–1481).

After the siege Skanderbeg was at the end of his resources. He lost all of his possessions except Krujë. The other nobles from the region of Albania allied with Murad II as he came to save them from the oppression. Even after the sultan's withdrawal they rejected Skanderbeg's efforts to enforce his authority over their domains. Skanderbeg then travelled to Ragusa, urging for assistance, and the Ragusans informed Pope Nicholas V. Through financial assistance, Skanderbeg managed to hold Krujë and regain much of his territory. Skanderbeg's success brought praise from all over Europe and ambassadors were sent to him from Rome, Naples, Hungary, and Burgundy.

=== Ottoman Campaign of Albulena ===
The local population remained faithful to Skanderbeg and did not reveal his whereabouts. Isak bey and Hamza grew confident that Skanderbeg had been defeated and had thus began to withdraw. When he judged the time right, Skanderbeg gave the signal for the army, which had up until then been in separate groups, to assemble without being seen by the Ottomans. The army gathered by the hills at Tumenishta – as the weakest point in the Ottoman camp was in this direction – and on 2 September 1457, it was split again into three groups to assault the Ottoman camp. With some of his most trusted men, he climbed to a high peak to scout on the Ottoman camp and saw that the Ottomans were resting. He descended with his chosen band to eliminate any watching guards, but one saw Skanderbeg and fled into the camp yelling that Skanderbeg had arrived. In order to maintain the surprise, Skanderbeg ordered his men to get ready for battle.

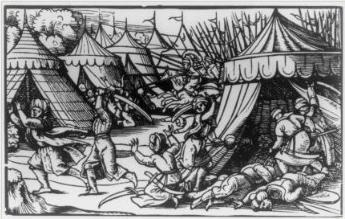
Albanian assault on the Turkish camp during the battle

With the accompaniment of loud noise made from metallic tools and weapons being clapped together, the Albanians charged into the Turkish camp. The Ottomans were caught by surprise and, despite their large numbers, were terrified by the fury of the Albanian assault, thinking they were attacking in larger numbers than they actually had. Hamza tried to reorder his men, assuring them that the Albanians were few. Isak bey, tried to send reinforcements to Hamza's men, but the arrival of new Albanian contingents forced him to turn his attention. A series of cavalry charges and counter-charges kept the battle moving with a rain of missiles and arquebusiers forcing the Ottomans into the heart of the camp. Seeing that they were surrounded, the Ottoman force began to panic and melted away. Hamza was thus captured, though Isak bey fled. The Ottoman dead may have been as high as 30,000, but it is unlikely that they suffered more than 15,000 deaths. In addition, 15,000 men were taken prisoner, twenty-four standards were captured, and all the riches in the camp were lost to the Albanians. A multitude of men were also captured, among them Hamza Kastrioti. The fallen Albanian warriors were buried in the Cathedral of St. Mary in the village of Shumri (3 kilometres (1.9 mi) east of Mamurrasi) near the battlefield.

The Battle of Albulena was significant for the southern resistance against the Ottoman Empire. Franz Babinger, a historian of the Ottoman Empire, describes the battle as Skanderbeg's most brilliant victory. The battle of Albulena strengthened the morale of Skanderbeg's men who afterwards rarely, if at all, deserted his army as Hamza had. Hamza himself was sent as a prisoner to Naples in Alfonso's realm after being captured. An Ottoman envoy was sent to ransom the standard bearers and forty of the distinguished prisoners. The envoy also tried to settle for a truce between Mehmed and Skanderbeg, but the latter responded that he would only accept if Svetigrad and Berat, which had been lost in 1448 and 1450 respectively, were restored to his state. Seeing that Mehmed would not accept such terms, Skanderbeg strengthened his garrisons in the area around Svetigrad. The victory still bought Albania and Italy time; in 1460, Mehmed and Skanderbeg signed an armistice that lasted three years. This gave Skanderbeg the opportunity to land in Italy and help out Alfonso's son, Ferdinand I of Naples, who had been crowned after his father had died. The battle thus opened a new phase in the Ottoman-Albanian war which saw the high-water mark of the Albanian resistance and the fiercest Ottoman invasions of Albania in the war. The war would last until the fall of Krujë in 1478.

=== Death of Skanderbeg ===
In Western Europe the death of Skanderbeg was mourned by princes and other rulers such as Ferdinand I. In a condolence letter written to Skanderbeg's widow dated 24 February 1468, Ferdinand expressed pain of having lost his friend and promised assistance to Skanderbeg's family. During Skanderbeg's lifetime, his assistance to King Alphonse I by sending troops to quell an uprising and later his expedition to suppress a revolt on behalf of King Ferdinand led to Albanian mercenaries and other soldiers being allowed by the Neapolitan monarchs to settle villages in Southern Italy. With the death of Skanderbeg and the conquest of his domains by the Ottomans, Albanian leaders and other Albanians found refuge in the Kingdom of Naples. These events and migrations contributed to the formation of the Arbëresh community and many of their settlements in southern Italy that still exist in the modern era.

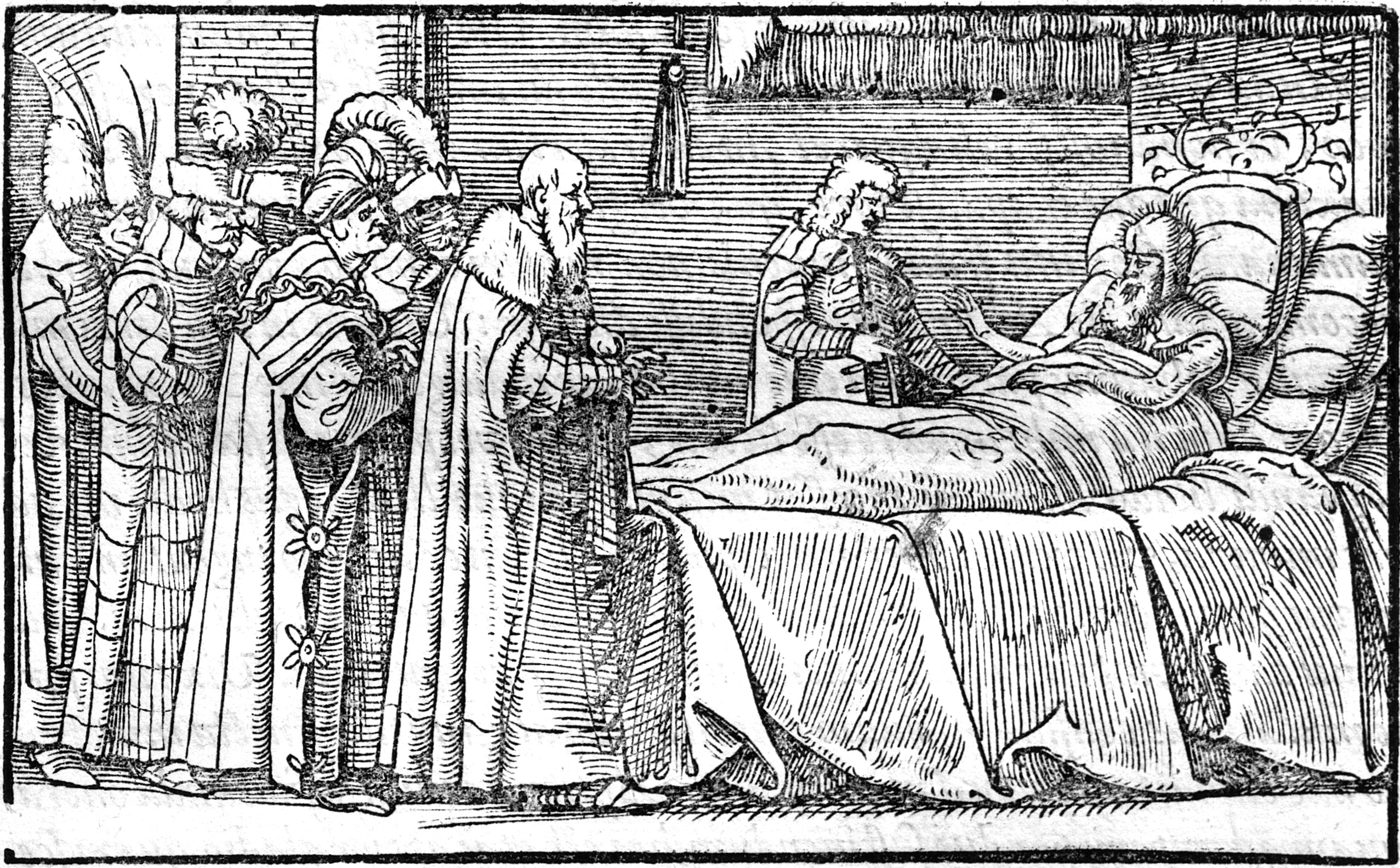
The death of Skanderbeg

Ivan Strez Balšić was perceived by Venice as Skanderbeg's successor. After Skanderbeg's death Ivan and his brother Gojko Balšić, together with Leke, Progon and Nicholas Dukagjini, continued to fight for Venice. In 1469 Ivan requested from the Venetian Senate to return him his confiscated property consisting of Castle Petrela, woivodate of "Terra nuova" of Kruje (unknown position), territory between Kruje and Durrës and villages in the region of Bushnesh (today part of the Kodër-Thumanë municipality). Venice largely conceded to the wishes of Ivan Balšić and installed him as Skanderbeg's successor.

After Skanderbeg's death, Venice asked and obtained from his widow the permission to defend Krujë and the other fortresses with Venetian garrisons. Krujë held out during its fourth siege, started in 1477 by Gedik Ahmed Pasha, until 16 June 1478, when the city was starved to death and finally surrendered to Sultan Mehmed II himself. Demoralized and severely weakened by hunger and lack of supplies from the year-long siege, the defenders surrendered to Mehmed, who had promised to allow them to leave unharmed in exchange. As the Albanians were walking away with their families, however, the Ottomans killed the men and enslaved the women and children. In 1479, an Ottoman army, headed again by Mehmed II, besieged and captured Shkodër, reducing Venice's Albanian possessions to only Durazzo, Antivari, and Dulcigno. Skanderbeg's son John Castriot II continued the resistance against the Ottomans, and tried to liberate territories from Ottoman rule in 1481–84. In addition, a major revolt in 1492 occurred in southern Albania, mainly in the Labëria region, and Bayazid II was personally involved with crushing the resistance. In 1501, George Castriot II, grandson of Skanderbeg and son of John Castriot II, along with Progon Dukagjini and around 150–200 stratioti, went to Lezhë and organized a local uprising, but that too was unsuccessful. The Venetians evacuated Durazzo in 1501.

After the fall of Albania to the Ottomans the Kingdom of Naples gave land and noble title to Skanderbeg's family, the Castriota. His family were given control over the Duchy of San Pietro in Galatina and the County of Soleto in the Province of Lecce, Italy. His son, John Castriot II, married Jerina Branković, daughter of Serbian despot Lazar Branković and one of the last descendants of the Palaiologos.

Two lines of the Castriota family lived in southern Italy, one of which descended from Pardo Castriota Scanderbeg and the other from Achille Castriota Scanderbeg, who were both biological sons of Ferrante, the son of John Castriot II and his wife Jerina. They were highly ranked Italian nobility and members of the Sovereign Military Order of Malta.

The only legitimate daughter of Duke Ferrante, Irene Castriota Scanderbeg, born to Andreana Acquaviva d'Aragona from the Nardò dukes, inherited the Castriota paternal estate, bringing the Duchy of Galatina and County of Soleto into the Sanseverino family after her marriage with Prince Pietrantonio Sanseverino (1508–1559). They had a son, Nicolò Bernardino Sanseverino (1541–1606).

=== After Skanderbegs death till 1478 ===
The Fourth Siege of Krujë by the Ottoman Empire of Krujë in Albania occurred in 1478, ten years after the death of the Skanderbeg, and resulted in the town's capture after the failure of three prior sieges.

Demoralized and severely weakened by hunger and lack of supplies from the year-long siege, the Albanian defenders surrendered to Sultan Mehmed II, who had promised them they could leave unharmed in exchange. One of the important historical sources about this siege is the fourth volume of the Annali Veneti e del Mondo manuscript written by Stefano Magno.

==== Battle of Shkodra ====
Strong Ottoman forces besieged Shkodra in spring 1474. Mehmed had dispatched the governor of Rumelia, Hadım Suleiman Pasha, with about 8,000 men, but they were repulsed by commander Antonio Loredan and feared Venetian reinforcements. According to some sources, when Scutari garrison complained for lack of food and water, Loredan told them "If you are hungry, here is my flesh; if you are thirsty, I give you my blood."

The Venetian Senate ordered all available galleys to transport archers to Shkodra through river Bojana. All Venetian governors were also ordered to help the besieged city. According to Venetian reports in July Shkodra was besieged by 50,000 Ottoman soldiers who were supported by heavy artillery.

At the beginning of 1474 the whole region around Shkodra, including the abandoned Baleč, came under Ottoman rule. According to some sources the Ottoman sultan had intentions to rebuild Podgorica and Baleč in 1474 and to settle them with 5,000 Turkish families in order to establish an additional obstacle for cooperation of Crnojević's Zeta and besieged Venetian Shkodra.

During their 1474 campaign Ottomans damaged Alessio and razed Dagnum castle.

Triadan Gritti was appointed as Venetian captain general instead of Pietro Mocenigo. Gritti led the Venetian fleet of six galleys which sailed early in May 1474 to protect the coast of Albania Veneta and especially the mouths of river Bojana. When Venetian fleet entered Bojana the Ottoman forces attempted to block it by clogging the mouth of Bojana with a cut tree trunks, just like Serbian voivode Mazarek did during Second Scutari War. Gritti returned his fleet down the river and destroyed Ottoman forces on 15 June 1474. Despite all of his efforts, Gritti was not able to deliver to Scutari all goods his fleet carried because many of his ships were trapped in the shallow waters of Bojana near Sveti Srđ.

When Gritti joined Mocenigo in Shkodra and they both ordered to Leonardo Boldù to find Ivan Crnojević and to urge him to mobilize as many of his men as possible to help Venetians during the Siege of Shkodra. Boldù was also ordered to transport Crnojević's cavalry and infantry over the Skadar Lake. Ivan Crnojević had important role in the defense of the Shkodra because he provided connection with Kotor and supplied the city through Žabljak or Skadar Lake, fighting simultaneously against strong Ottoman forces. He transported men and woods from Kotor over the hills into Žabljak where he built fustas which surprised Ottomans at Skadar lake. During whole summer Ivan Crnojević participated in military actions. He controlled the Skadar lake with three fustas and 15 smaller ships, which was very important because Venetian fleet (composed of 34 larger ships and about 100 smaller) was unable to sail further than Sveti Srđ. Boldù was able to reach the besieged city from Žabljak thanks to the ships of Ivan Crnojević. The crew of Venetian ships together with stratioti from Greece joined the defenders in the besieged city and, according to some Venetian reports, their total number reached 25,000.

After the discovery of the treason committed by Andreas Humoj, a member of Humoj family, during the Siege of Shkodra Gritti sentenced him to death and had him executed by a man from Tuzi.

Between 7,000 and 20,000 Ottoman soldiers are reported to have been killed, and approximately 3,000 civilians from Scutari died of thirst and hunger. In the siege, the outer walls were damaged significantly. The citizens rebuilt the walls in anticipation of a stronger Ottoman attack later. The Ottomans did return in 1478 to conquer Shkodra.

== Forces ==
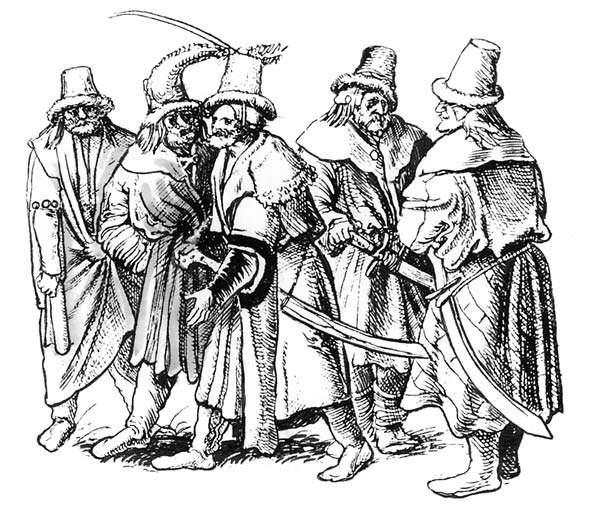
Urs Graf, Stradioti (XV century)

Skanderbeg's rebellion was primarily located in Northern and Central Albania, Malësia, and Western North Macedonia, but also extended into Southern Albania, Kosovo, and Albania Veneta. In addition to Albanians, who composed the bulk of his forces, his followers also included Slavs, Vlachs, and Greeks; during the latter parts of the war he also had at his service Venetian and Neapolitan mercenaries. Skanderbeg's revolt represented a reaction by sections of local society and feudal lords against the loss of privilege and the exactions of the Ottoman government which they resented. As well as Turks, the League also fought against members of their own ethnic groups because the Ottoman forces, both commanders and soldiers, were composed of local people (Albanians, Slavs, Vlachs, Greeks and Turkish timar holders), as well as Turks from Anatolia. Dorotheos, the Archbishop of Ohrid and clerics and boyars of Ohrid Archbishopric together with considerable number of Christian citizens of Ohrid were expatriated by sultan to Istanbul in 1466 because of their anti-Ottoman activities during Skanderbeg's rebellion. Skanderbeg's rebellion was also supported by Greeks in the Morea. According to Fan Noli, the most reliable counselor of Skanderbeg was Vladan Jurica.

=== League of Lezhë (1444–1479) ===
On 2 March 1444 the regional Albanian and Serbian chieftains united against the Ottoman Empire. This alliance (League of Lezhë) was forged in the Venetian held Lezhë. A couple of months later Skanderbeg's forces stole cattle of the citizens of Lezhë and captured their women and children. The main members of the league were the Arianiti, Balšić, Dukagjini, Muzaka, Spani, Thopia and Crnojevići. All earlier and many modern historians accepted Marin Barleti's news about this meeting in Lezhë (without giving it equal weight), although no contemporary Venetian document mentions it. Barleti referred to the meeting as the generalis concilium or universum concilium [general or whole council]; the term "League of Lezhë" was coined by subsequent historians.

== Aftermath ==
After the death of Skanderbeg in 1468, the organized Albanian resistance against the Ottomans came to an end. Like much of the Balkans, Albania became subject to the invading Turks. Many of its people under the rule of Luca Baffa and Marco Becci fled to the neighboring countries and settled in a few villages in Calabria. From the time of Skanderbeg's death until 1480 there were constant migrations of Albanians to the Italian coast. Throughout the 16th century, these migrations continued and other Albanian villages were formed on Italian soil. The new immigrants often took up work as mercenaries hired by the Italian armies.

The years and richest migration date back to between 1468 and 1506, when the Venetians, the Albanians, had heard Mehmed II's insatiable languishing after more domination. More and more Albanian cities and fortresses belong to Ottoman rule. The representation was rejected and slaughtered. Many Albanians who foresaw the entire occupation of their homeland and the revenge of the Ottomans, the example of those Albanians who had already settled in southern Italy. From the ports of Ragusa, Skutari and Lezha she heard her home on Venetian, Neapolitan and Albanian ships.

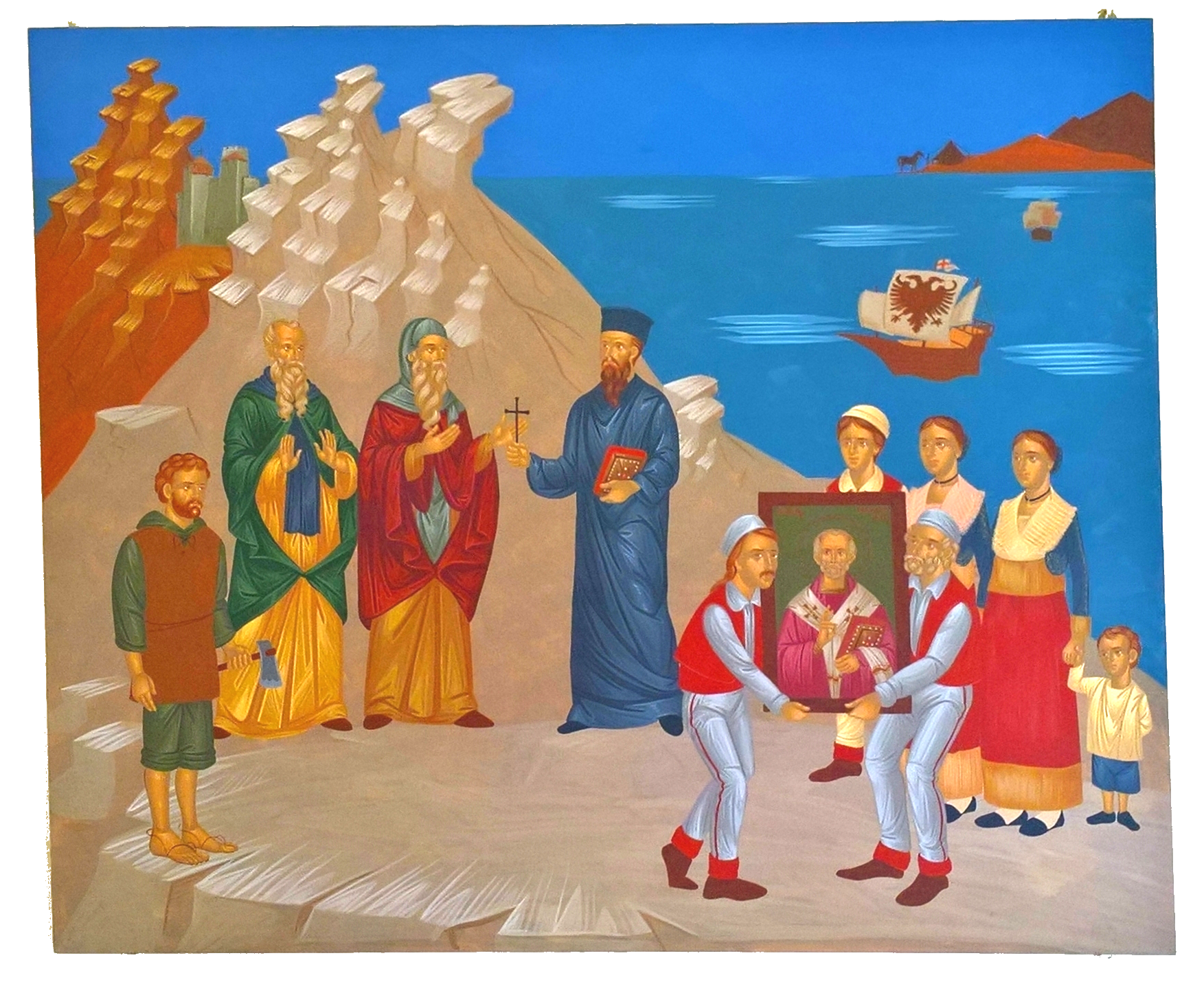
The arrival of the Albanians in Italy

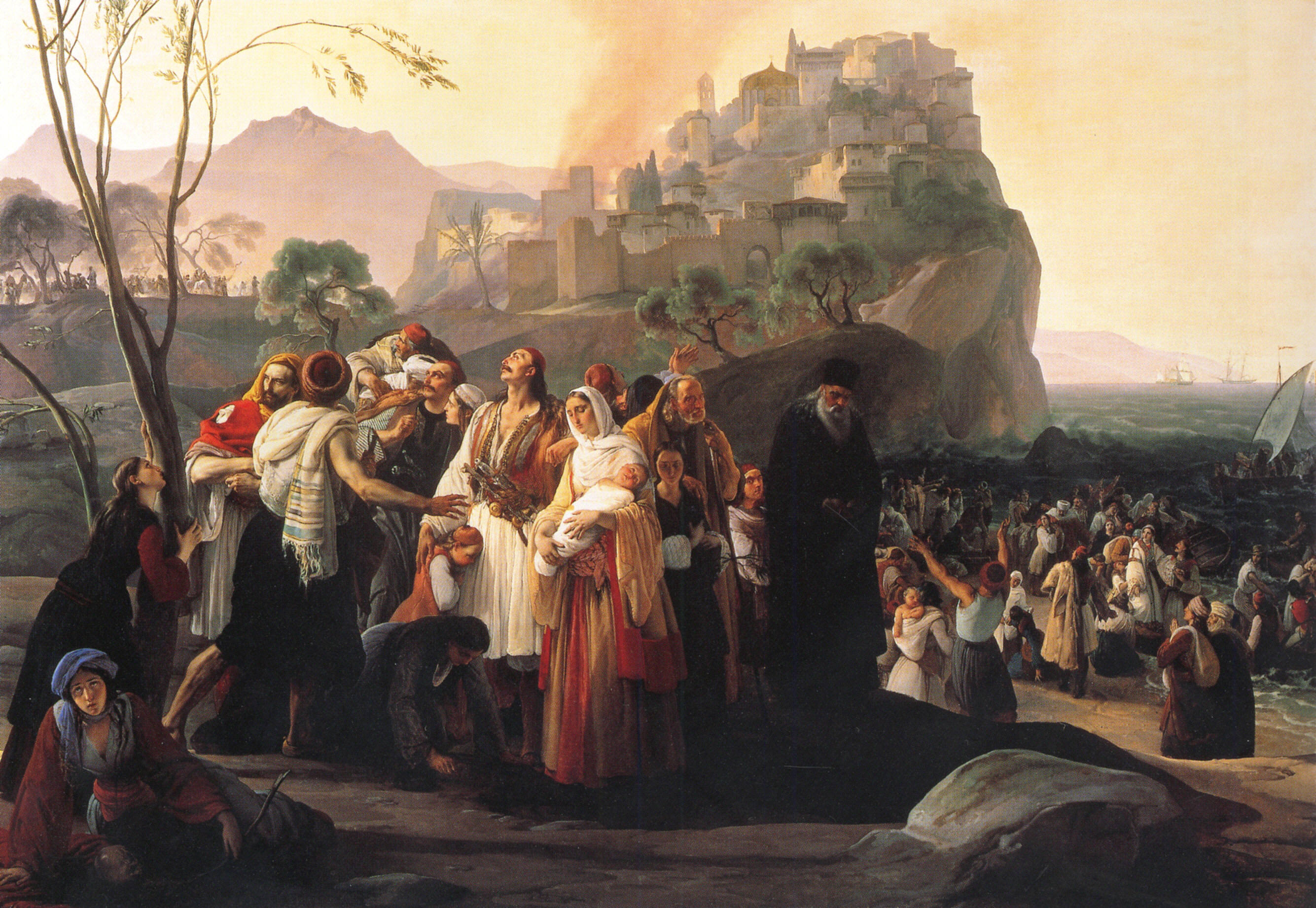
Francesco Hayez, Refugees from Parga as they abandon their homeland

Pope Paul II wrote to the Duke of Burgundy: “The cities [of Albania], which were wider up to this day the rage of the Turks, have come under their control from now on. All the peoples who inhabit the shores of the Adriatic Sea tremble at the threat they face. Everywhere you see horror, grief, captivity and death. It is not without tears that you can see the ships that flee from the Albanian leadership themselves in the ports of Italy, those bare miserable families who stretch out their hands to the sky from their own contents of the sea and hear the air with lamentations in an unintelligible language . " Many of the Albanians who fled to Italy, those of the local feudal lords in the populated areas and civil rights. You need to feel settled in Genazzano to feel settled in Genazzano. Others in the Marche, a country where they are listed in Urbino and other places in central Italy; of these, all memories are quickly lost.

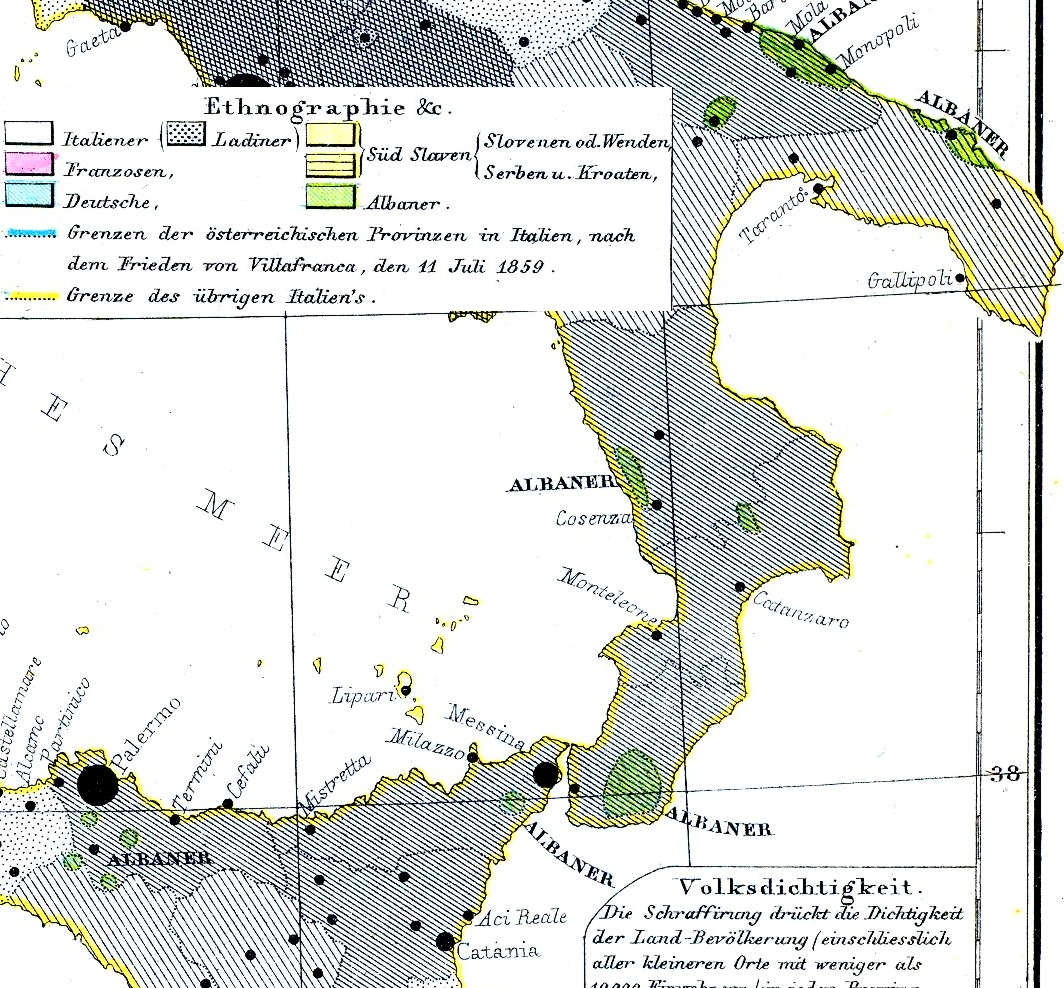
Detail of a German ethnographic map of South Italy from 1859, in which the Albanian/Albaner communities are indicated in green.

The arrival of the Arbëresh in Italy with their dads and their cult image; Icon in the Chiesa Santissimo Salvatore in Cosenza There is more to say of those who belonged to the Kingdom of Naples and selected mountainous areas around Benevento (today in Campania) and Barile (1477) and Melfi (today in Basilicata), where they found dilapidated houses, abandoned and devastated places, often also inhabited old abbeys. Still others in Calabria and the countryside, where in the province of Cosenza near Corigliano Calabro and the slopes of the Sila massif, the towns of Lungro, Firmo, Macchia Albanese, San Cosmo Albanese, San Demetrio Corone, San Giorgio Albanese, Santa Sofia d ' Epiro, Spezzano Albanese and Vaccarizzo Albanese. Others plan to settle on the heights of the Ionian Sea from Sinni to Crati, from Cosenza to the sea. Some families of the old nobility in Trani and Otranto ashore. [66] The Basta family should be mentioned, who became rights and powerful in Genoa and Venice. In 1759, Ferdinand IV attributed the family to the nobility of Taranto with another document. A Giorgio Basta war captain and baron of Civitella and Pasquale Teodoro Basta (born April 26, 1711, in Monteparano, † December 27, 1765) was heard on January 29, 1748, as Bishop of Melfi and Rapolla.

After the conquest of Kruja (1478) and Shkodra (1479) by the Ottomans, Albanian nobles fled further to the Kingdom of Naples in order to include the revenge of the Ottomans and Islamization. Many Catholic Albanian families with a Byzantine rite belong to their compatriots and belonged to the “Casali” in the province of Cosenza. Acquaformosa, Castroregio, Cavallerizzo (now a fraction of Cerzeto), Cervicati, Cerzeto, Civita, Frascineto, Ehe (now a fraction of San Benedetto Ullano), Mongrassano, Percile, Plataci, Rota Greca, San Basile, San Benedetto Ullano, Santa Caterina Albanese, San Giacomo di Cerzeto (today the Cerzeto fraction), Serra di Leo (near Mongrassano) and many other places of which traces have been lost in the future.

Others belong to the Royal Charter in Sicily, where they belong to the settlements seized by the soldiers of Reres in 1448. But new settlements were also created: in the province of Palermo 1481 Palazzo Adriano, 1488 Piana dei Greci, 1490 Mezzojuso and 1691 Santa Cristina Gela in the province of Catania 1488 Biancavilla. For their own rights, some belong to agriculture or animal husbandry and others to the army of Catholic Ferdinand II, King of Sicily. Peter and Mercurio Bua, Blaschi Bischettino, Giorgio and Demetrius Capusmede, Lazarus Comilascari, Giorgio Matrancha (Junior), Biaggio Musacchio from the Musacchi family (princes and despots of Epirus), Cesare Urana (Vranà), and other human beings Soldiers and captains who, with their martial art, emperor Charles V in the Tunis campaign (1535), in the wars in Italy.

Another wave of emigration, between 1500 and 1534, relates to Arbëreshë from central Greece. Employed as mercenaries by Venice, they had to evacuate the colonies of the Peloponnese with the assistance of the troops of Charles V, as the Turks had invaded that region. Charles V established these troops in Italy of the South to reinforce defense against the threat of Turkish invasion. Established in insular villages (which enabled them to maintain their culture until the 20th century), Arbëreshë were, traditionally, soldiers for the Kingdom of Naples and the Republic of Venice, from the Wars of Religion to the Napoleonic invasion.
