= Battle of Torvioll =

1444 battle of the Ottoman–Albanian wars

Coordinates: 41°46′N 20°22′E

Battle of Torvioll Beteja e Torviollit
- Part of the Albanian–Ottoman Wars (1432–1479)
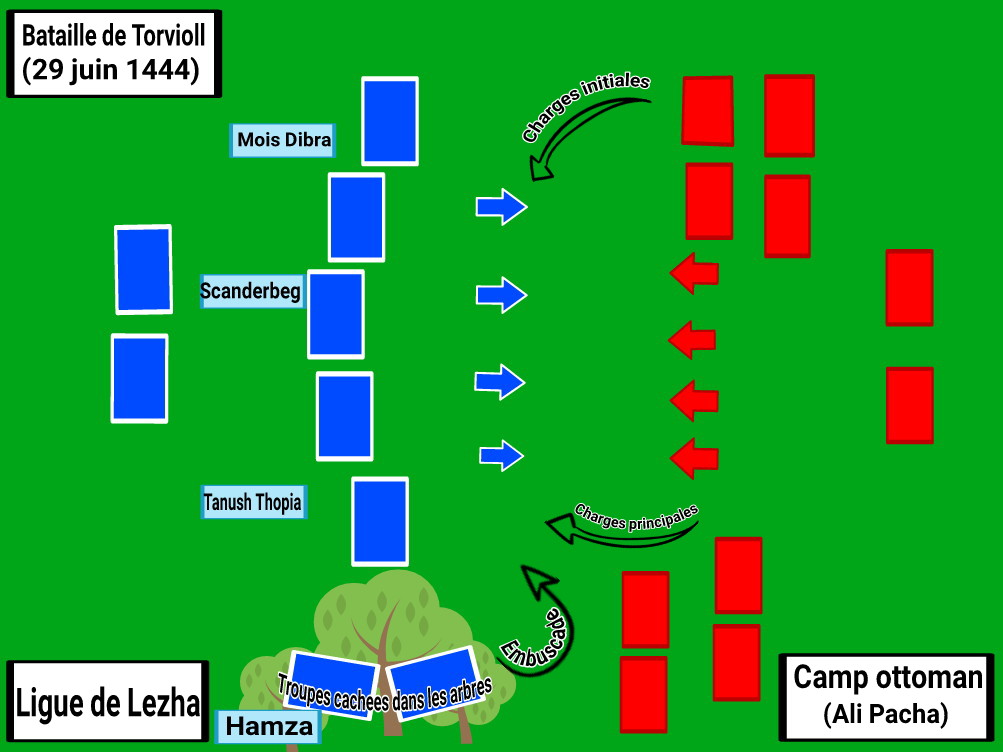
- Battle plan at Torvioll
Date	29 June 1444
Location	Plain of Torvioll, north of Peshkopi (present-day Plain of Shumbat, Albania)
Result	Albanian victory

Belligerents
League of Lezhë	Ottoman Empire

Commanders and leaders
Skanderbeg; Hamza Kastrioti; Tanush Thopia; Moisi Arianiti; Ajdin Muzaka (WIA)	(Ottoman Empire) Ali Pasha

Strength
10,000–15,000	15,000–25,000

Casualties and losses
3,800–4,000 killed or wounded	7,000–10,000 killed 500–2,000 captured

The Battle of Torvioll (Albanian: Beteja e Torviollit), also known as the Battle of Lower Dibra, was fought on 29 June 1444 on the Plain of Torvioll, in what is now Albania. Gjergj Kastrioti Skanderbeg was an Albanian nobleman who decided to return to his homeland and take the reins of a new Albanian league against the Ottoman Empire. He and 300 other Albanians who fought in the Battle of Niš deserted the Ottoman Army and made their way to Krujë, which quickly fell due to subversion. He then formed the League of Lezhë, a confederation of Albanian princes united in war against the Ottoman Empire. Realising the threat, Murad II sent one of his most experienced generals, Ali Pasha, to crush the new state with a force of 25,000–40,000 men.

Skanderbeg organised an army of 10,000-15,000 men assembled from the League of Lezhë to defeat Ali Pasha's army. The Albanians confronted Ali Pasha on his way to Krujë, and on 29 June 1444, Skanderbeg's forces split into three groups and pretended to retreat, drawing the Ottomans into the gorge of Torvioll as they dispersed in the surrounding mountains. The Albanians regrouped and attacked the Ottomans in the gorge, who were confident that the Albanians had retreated, resulting in the defeat of the Ottomans.

The victory consolidated Skanderbeg's leading role in the League of Lezhë and boosted the morale of the Albanians in their struggle against the Ottoman Empire. The battle encouraged Pope Eugenius IV and John Hunyadi to organise a new crusade against the Ottomans in the autumn of 1444. Skanderbeg would lead the Albanians against the Ottomans for twenty-five years of constant warfare until his death.

== Background ==
Gjergj Kastrioti Skanderbeg, the son of the powerful prince Gjon Kastrioti, had been a vassal of the Ottoman Empire as a sipahi, or cavalry commander. After his participation in the Ottoman loss at the Battle of Niš, Skanderbeg deserted the Ottoman army and rushed to Albania alongside 300 other Albanians. By forging a letter from Murad II to the Governor of Krujë, he became lord of the city in November 1443. Hungarian captain John Hunyadi's continued operations against Sultan Murad II gave Skanderbeg time to prepare an alliance of the Albanian nobles. Skanderbeg invited all of Albania's nobles to meet in the Venetian-held town of Alessio (Lezhë) on 2 March 1444. Alessio was chosen as the meeting point because the town had once been the capital of the Dukagjini family and to induce Venice to lend aid to the Albanian movement. Among the nobles that attended were George Arianiti, Pal Dukagjini, Andrea Thopia, Lekë Dushmani, Theodor Corona Musachi, Peter Spani, Lekë Zaharia, and Pal Strez Balsha. Here they formed the League of Lezhë, a confederation of all of the major Albanian princes in alliance against the Ottoman Empire. The chosen captain (Albanian: Kryekapedan) of this confederation was Skanderbeg. The League's first military challenge came in the spring of 1444, when Skanderbeg's scouts reported that the Ottoman army was planning to invade Albania. Skanderbeg planned to move towards the anticipated entry point and prepared for an engagement.

== Campaign ==
=== Prelude ===
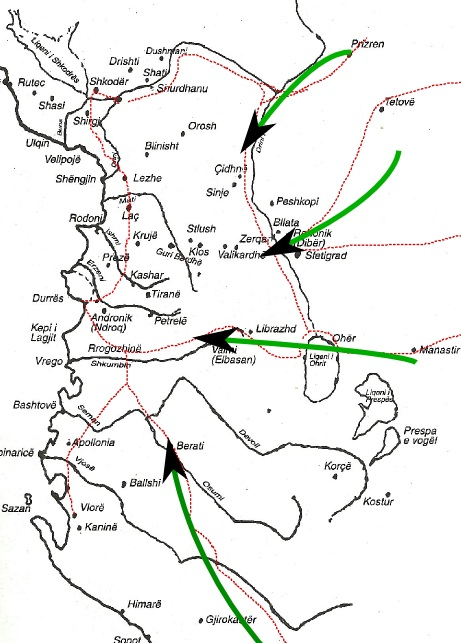
The main roads through Albania and the most common Ottoman invasion routes.

Skanderbeg's Albanian resistance movement began directly after the Hungarian Crusade of 1443-1444, and so the Ottoman sultan Murad II sought to end it immediately. Ali Pasha, one of Murad's most favoured commanders, left Üsküp (Skopje) in June 1444 with an army of 25,000–40,000 troops, entering Albanian territory by following the flow of the Drin from the north to the south, and headed for the region of Krujë.

Skanderbeg assembled an army of 10,000-15,000 men from the League of Lezhë, 8,000 of which were on horseback. The majority of the forces were feudal levies, but Skanderbeg had a select contingent of paid permanent troops at his disposal that numbered to over 2,000 men.

Skanderbeg and his army headed towards the planned battle site in Lower Dibra, which is thought to be the Plain of Shumbat, then called the Plain of Torvioll, north of Peshkopi. On the way there, he marched through the Black Drin valley and appeared at the expected Ottoman entry point, the Plain of Domosdove, where his forces came face-to-face with the Ottomans. Skanderbeg had chosen the plain of Torvioll himself: it was 11.2 kilometres (7.0 mi) long and 4.9 kilometres (3.0 mi) wide, surrounded by hills and forests. After camping near Torvioll, Skanderbeg placed 3,000 men under five commanders, Hamza Kastrioti, Muzaka of Angelina, Zakaria Gropa, Peter Emanueli, and Gjon Muzaka, in the surrounding forests with orders to attack the Ottoman wings and rear only after a given signal. While Skanderbeg was preparing his ambush, the Ottoman Turks under Ali Pasha arrived and set up camp opposite of the Albanian forces. The night before the battle, the Ottomans celebrated the coming day as they were certain of victory, whereas the Albanians extinguished all their campfires and those who were not on guard were directed to rest. Parties of Ottomans made approaches to the Albanian camp and provoked Skanderbeg's soldiers, but they remained quiet. Skanderbeg sent out a scouting party to obtain information about the Ottoman army and ordered his cavalry to engage in small skirmishes.

=== Battle ===
On the morning of 29 June, Skanderbeg's army was divided into three parts and proceeded to feign a retreat, whilst 3,000 cavalrymen were hidden in a forest behind Ottoman forces under the command of Hamza Kastrioti. The Ottomans were drawn into the gorge of Torvioll as Skanderbeg and his men dispersed into the surrounding mountains and forests. Ali Pasha, confident that the Albanians had indeed retreated, prepared to declare his victory over Skanderbeg. However, unbeknownst to the Ottomans, the Albanians regrouped and eventually attacked the Ottomans deployed in the gorge. At some point, Skanderbeg gave Hamza and the hidden cavalry the signal to attack, and they surrounded the Ottoman forces and defeated them.

== Aftermath ==
Between 7,000-10,000 Ottoman troops died as a result of the battle, with around 500-2,000 taken as prisoner, whereas 3,800-4,000 Albanians were either dead or wounded. Skanderbeg's victory was praised through the rest of Europe, and the Battle of Torvioll opened up the almost 40 years of war between the League of Lezhë and the Ottoman Empire. The Albanian victory boosted the morale of Skanderbeg's followers and further consolidated his prestige within the League of Lezhë as its leader.

== Sources ==
- Frashëri, Kristo (2002). Gjergj Kastrioti Skënderbeu: jeta dhe vepra (1405-1468) (in Albanian). Tirana: Botimet Toena. ISBN 99927-1-627-4.
- Fine, John (1994), The Late Medieval Balkans: A Critical Survey from the Late Twelfth Century to the Ottoman Conquest, University of Michigan Press, ISBN 0-472-08260-4
- Francione, Gennaro (2006) [2003]. Aliaj, Donika (ed.). Skënderbeu, një hero modern : (Hero multimedial) [Skanderbeg, a modern hero (Hero multimedia)] (in Albanian). Translated by Tasim Aliaj. Tiranë, Albania: Shtëpia botuese "Naim Frashëri". ISBN 99927-38-75-8.
- Franco, Demetrio (1539), Comentario de le cose de' Turchi, et del S. Georgio Scanderbeg, principe d' Epyr, Altobello Salkato, ISBN 99943-1-042-9
- Gibbon, Edward (1957), History of the Decline and Fall of the Roman Empire, Peter Fenelon Collier & Son
- Hodgkinson, Harry (1999). Scanderbeg: From Ottoman Captive to Albanian Hero. London: Centre for Albanian Studies. ISBN 978-1-873928-13-4.
- Moore, Clement Clarke (1850), George Castriot: Surnamed Scanderbeg, King of Albania, D. Appleton & Company
- Noli, Fan Stilian (2009), Scanderbeg, General Books, ISBN 978-1-150-74548-5
- Setton, Kenneth Meyer (1978). The Papacy and the Levant, 1204-1571. Philadelphia: American Philosophical Society. ISBN 978-0-87169-127-9.
