= Torvioll Plain =

Geographic region in eastern Albania

Coordinates: 41°46′N 20°22′E

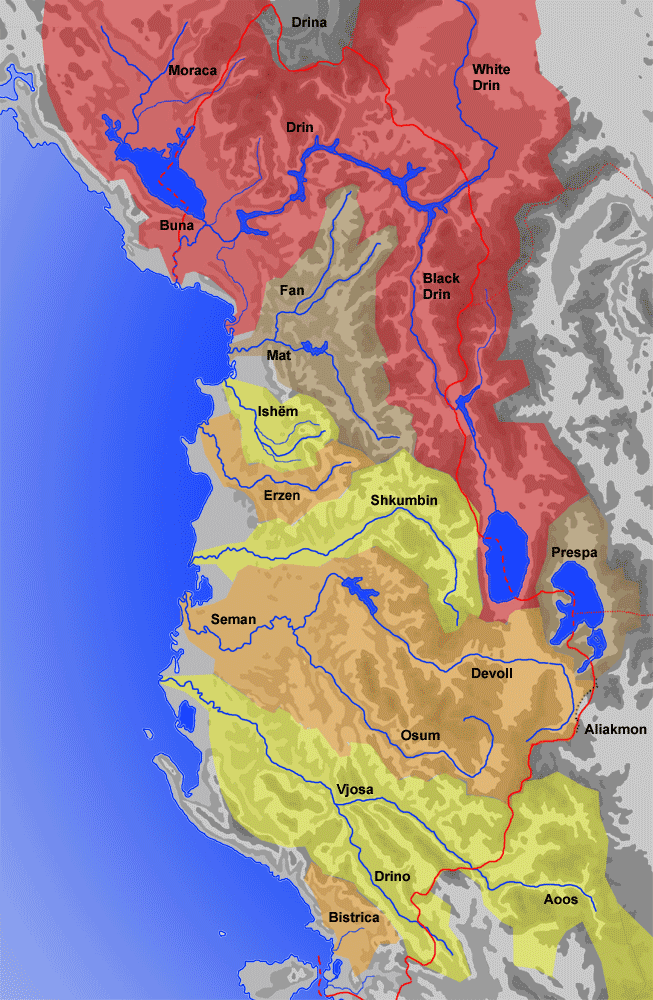
A map of Albania's major rivers

The Torvioll Plain, now named the Shumbat Plain, is located in the Lower Dibra region in eastern Albania, north of Peshkopi. It is most famous for being the battlefield for Skanderbeg's first battle against the Ottoman Empire in the Battle of Torvioll which took place on 29 June 1444. According to a defter gathered by the Ottomans in 1467, the region of Lower Dibra included the northern half of Dibran territory.

The plain, according to Giammaria Biemmi's work, one of the primary sources on Skanderbeg and his campaigns, was 7 miles (11 km) long and 3 miles (4.8 km) wide, stretching from Mount Maran in Lower Dibra to the Mokra Mountains. He also says that it is closed by a series of hills at whose feet runs the Shkumbin River and two heavily-wooded mountains where Skanderbeg hid his ambushing force. However, the Shkumbin River does not run through Lower Dibra. Instead, the Black Drin does. Kristo Frashëri, an eminent historian on the study of Skanderbeg, states that Biemmi lapsed, confusing the Black Drin with the Shkumbin. Furthermore, the Black Drin matches all of the geographical features described by Biemmi, as does the modern-day Plain of Shumbat.

Biemmi furthermore states that the plain derived its name from a nearby village. It is not certain whether this village actually existed, but it is assumed that Torvioll lends its etymology to the word tevioll in the Dibër dialect meaning land without a lord, noting that it did not have any owners and any shepherd could feed his livestock there. It is therefore possible that the battle was originally named after Tevioll and was corrupted to Torvioll.
