= Modrič, Struga =

Modrič Модрич
- Village
- Location within North Macedonia
- Coordinates: 41°21′59″N 20°34′23″E
- Country: North Macedonia
- Region: Southwestern
- Municipality: Struga

Population
  - Total: 25

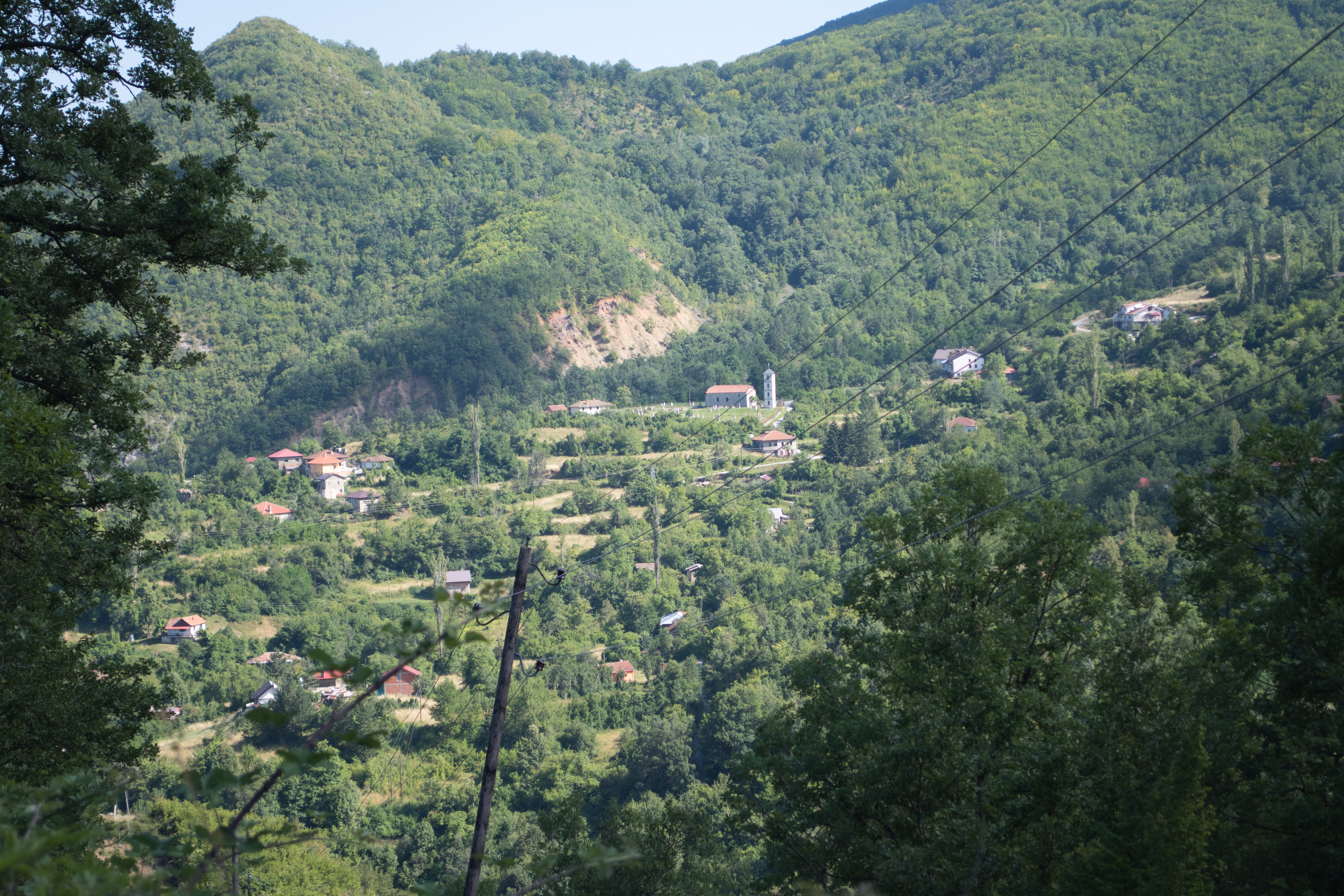
Panoramic view of the village.

Modrič (Macedonian: Модрич) is a village in Struga Municipality, in North Macedonia. There was a fortress on the hill Gradište, east of the current position of the village.

== History ==
Modrič fortress which was located in this village had a great importance during Ottoman rule because of its strategic position on the left bank of the river Black Drim, next to the road between Ohrid and Debar. On the other side of the road was Kodžadžik (then Svetigrad). At the beginning of the Ottoman rule Modrič was probably a little more important than Kožadžik. In November 1443 Skanderbeg revolted against the sultan and this fortress became one of Skanderbeg's strongholds. It was also mentioned in the works of Marin Barleti.

In 1448, Sultan Murad II besieged the fortress of Svetigrad. The first battle between Skanderbeg's and Ottoman forces during the Siege of Svetigrad (Kodžadžik) in 1448 was held at Modrič fortress.

In 1452, Ottoman forces from Ohrid attacked Skanderbeg's rebels but were defeated at Modrič where Hamza Kastrioti led Skanderbeg's rebels and Ottoman commander Hamza Pasha, his namesake.

According to Pollo and Puto, in 1456 Skanderbeg's nephew George Strez Balšić, who governed the fortress of Modrič, sold it to Ottomans. In 1467 this village was recorded in the Ottoman register as a timar of one Sinan who was a dizdar (castellan) of Modrič fortress. The fortress was probably destroyed to such extent that it was without garrison while its reconstruction was either impossible or unnecessary.

In 1914, the village became part of the Principality of Albania.

== Demography ==
At around 1467, Modrič fortress was registered as part of the Ottoman nahiyah Dolgo Brdo (Golo Brdo) and had only 7 households. Modrič (Modrica) belonged to the timar of Sinan, the dizdar of the castle. The anthroponymy attested depicts a Slavic character.

Modrič (Modriç) is again recorded in the Ottoman defter of 1583 as a village in the vilayet of Dulgobrda. The settlement had a total of 73 households with the anthroponymy attested being almost entirely Slavic in character, with a small minority of Albanian anthroponyms also appearing, albeit displaying instances of Slavicisation (e.g., Keko Pejo, Genko the brother of Gjuro Bogdani.).

According to the 2002 census all 25 inhabitants of Modrič declared as Macedonians. Berziti from Kičevo referred to people from Modrič and other surrounding villages (Lukovo, Jablanica...) as Keckars (Macedonian: Кецкари).
