= Hamza Kastrioti =

15th century Albanian nobleman

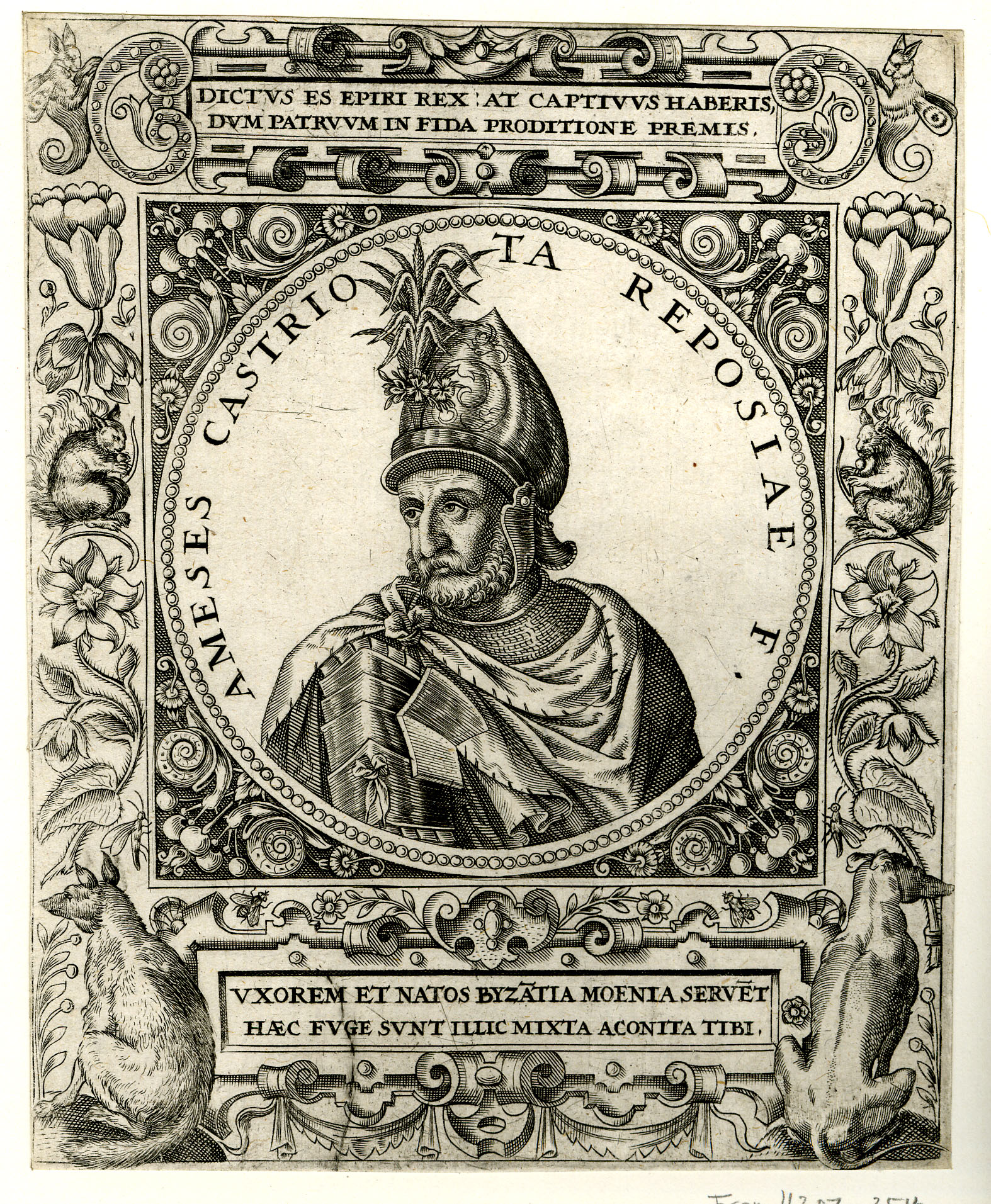
- 1596 engraving by Johann Theodor de Bry of Hamza Kastrioti
- Full name: Hamza Kastrioti; Branilo Kastrioti (after converting to Roman Catholicism)
- Noble family: Kastrioti
- Issue: Alfonso Kastrioti; Giovanni Kastrioti; Ferrante Kastrioti
- Father: Stanisha Kastrioti

Hamza Kastrioti (Latin: Ameses Castriota) was a 15th-century Albanian nobleman and the nephew of Gjergj Kastrioti Skanderbeg. After the Battle of Nish he deserted Ottoman troops together with his uncle Skanderbeg, converted to Christianity and changed his name to Branilo. He supported Skanderbeg's uprising and was the vice captain of Skanderbeg's troops when they captured Krujë in 1443.

== Biography ==
=== Early life ===
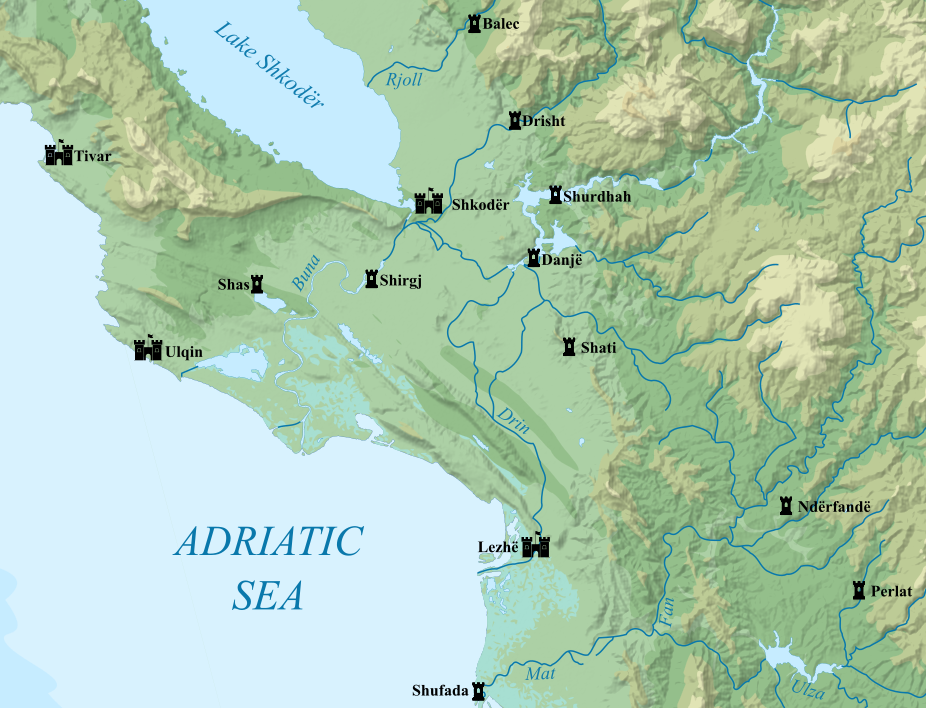
Balec and nearby towns during the Middle Ages

Hamza was born into the noble Albanian House of Kastrioti who ruled the Principality of Kastrioti. He was the son of Stanisha Kastrioti, who was the brother of the Albanian national hero Skanderbeg. His mother was likely a Turkish Muslim woman. He was probably born in Ottoman territory, after the death of his father, he was raised by Skanderbeg, who took him along on his military expeditions.

=== Military career ===
In 1448, Skanderbeg's forces under the command of Hamza Kastrioti and Marin Spani occupied the abandoned fortress town of Balec and reconstructed it while Skanderbeg began his war against Venice. Hamza Kastrioti did not wish to stay in the fortress and went to Drivast leaving Marin Span with 2,000 soldiers in Balec. Marin found the newly reconstructed fortress insecure and retreated with his soldiers toward Dagnum as soon as he was informed by his relative Pjetër Spani about the large Venetian forces heading toward Balec. Venetian forces recaptured Balec, burned wooden parts of the construction and destroyed reconstructed walls of the fortress.

=== Hamza’s desertion to the Sultan ===
After the marriage of Skanderbeg and the birth of his son Gjon, Hamza Kastrioti lost every hope of inheriting the Principality of Kastrioti. Hamza had become dissatisfied with Skanderbeg's growing power and, upon being received by the sultan, was offered control over much of Albania once conquered. He deserted to the Ottoman Sultan Mehmed II in 1457 and converted back to Islam and along with Isak-Beg he was one of the commanders of the Ottoman troops in the Battle of Ujëbardha. Stung by the betrayal, Skanderbeg offered an ultimatum to Venice where they had to halt their provocations or begin war.

==== Battle of Ujëbardha ====
During the battle, Hamza fought on the opposing side of his uncle Skanderbeg. Hamza brought along with him several disaffected Albanian nobles and personal knowledge of the tactics they could expect from Skanderbeg.

Due to Skanderbeg's "disappearance" during the battle, rumour's began to spread that he had fled since he was unable to confront the Ottomans and that his men had betrayed him. This was further upheld by the Venetians in Durazzo (Durrës). Isak bey and Hamza continued to be wary, however, and their reconnaissance forces reached as far north as Scutari (Shkodër). Skanderbeg remained in the mountains throughout July and August. It is not known with certainty what his army did while in the mountains, but he planned to wear the Ottomans out by forcing them to wait and to make them believe that he had been decisively defeated. Skanderbeg then sent Gjergj Pjetri (George Peter) to Rome as an ambassador to give the Pope the impression that Albania had been decisively conquered and that aid was necessary to force the Ottomans out of Albania.

The local population remained faithful to Skanderbeg and did not reveal his whereabouts. Isak bey and Hamza grew confident that Skanderbeg had been defeated and had thus began to withdraw. When he judged the time right, Skanderbeg gave the signal for the army, which had up until then been in separate groups, to assemble without being seen by the Ottomans. The army gathered by the hills at Tumenishta – as the weakest point in the Ottoman camp was in this direction – and on 2 September 1457, it was split again into three groups to assault the Ottoman camp. With some of his most trusted men, he climbed to a high peak to scout on the Ottoman camp and saw that the Ottomans were resting. He descended with his chosen band to eliminate any watching guards, but one saw Skanderbeg and fled into the camp yelling that Skanderbeg had arrived. In order to maintain the surprise, Skanderbeg ordered his men to get ready for battle.

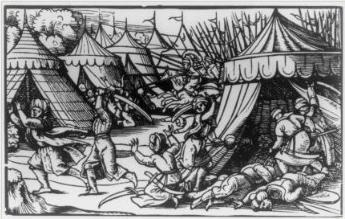
1539 engraving of an Albanian assault on an Ottoman camp during the battle.

With the accompaniment of loud noise made from metallic tools and weapons being clapped together, the Albanians charged into the Ottoman camp. The Ottomans were caught by surprise and, despite their large numbers, were terrified by the fury of the Albanian assault, thinking they were attacking in larger numbers than they actually had. Hamza tried to reorder his men, assuring them that the Albanians were few. Isak bey tried to send reinforcements to Hamza's men, but the arrival of new Albanian contingents forced him to divert his attention. A series of cavalry charges and counter-charges kept the battle moving with a rain of missiles and arquebusiers forcing the Ottomans into the heart of the camp. Seeing that they were surrounded, the Ottoman force began to panic and melted away.

Hamza was thus captured, though Isak bey fled. The Ottoman dead may have been as high as 30,000, but it is unlikely that they suffered more than 15,000 deaths. In addition, 15,000 men were taken prisoner, twenty-four standards were captured, and all the riches in the camp were lost to the Albanians.

==== Aftermath ====
The battle of Albulena was significant for the southern resistance against the Ottoman Empire. Franz Babinger, a historian of the Ottoman Empire, describes the battle as Skanderbeg's most brilliant victory. The battle of Albulena strengthened the morale of Skanderbeg's men who afterwards rarely, if at all, deserted his army as Hamza had.

In the battle he was captured by Skanderbeg's forces and placed in detention in Naples on charges of treason. He was later freed and went to join his wife and children in Constantinople, and continued to serve in the Ottoman high ranks. His loss was regarded as a tragedy by Albanians. He was one of the most brilliant generals of Skanderbeg and was very popular among the soldiers for his manners, second only to Skanderbeg. According to historians, along with him, the League of Lezhë lost the chance to continue what Skanderbeg had begun.

== Ancestry ==
Ancestors of Hamza Kastrioti

16. Konstantin Kastrioti
8. Pal Kastrioti
4. Gjon Kastrioti
2. Stanisha Kastrioti
5. Voisava Tripalda
1. Hamza Kastrioti

== See also ==
- Principality of Kastrioti
- League of Lezhë
- Battle of Albulena
- House of Kastrioti
- Skanderbeg
