= Battle of Kashar =

Battle in 1465 during the Albanian-Ottoman Wars

Battle of Kashar Beteja e Kasharit
- Part of the Albanian–Ottoman Wars (1432–1479), Skanderbeg's rebellion and Ballaban's campaign of 1465
| Date | 28 October 1465 |
| Location | Kashar, Principality of Kastrioti (modern-day Albania) |
| Result | Albanian victory |

Belligerents
| League of Lezhë | Ottoman Empire |

Commanders and leaders
| Skanderbeg | Jakup Pasha † |

Strength
| 11,000 men; 4,000 infantrymen and archers; 7,000 cavalry | 12,000–16,000 men; 2,000 infantrymen and archers; 10,000 cavalry |

Casualties and losses
| Very light | 10,000 killed |

The Battle of Kashar (Albanian: Beteja e Kasharit) occurred on 28 October 1465 near the village of Kashar, near today's Tirana, between the Albanian-resistance forces of the League of Lezhë led by Skanderbeg and the Ottoman army led by Jakup Arnauti, during the campaign of Ballaban Badera. Jakup Arnauti and his force initially expected to "meet-up" with his fellow general Ballaban; however, he encountered Skanderbeg's army, leading to the ensuing battle.

== Background ==
During the summer of 1465, Ballaban Badera, the sanjak-bey of the Sanjak of Ohrid launched his fourth campaign against Skanderbeg and the League of Lezhë with an army of 18,000-24,000 men. Ballaban's army was also assisted by the army of Jakup Arnauti (also known as Jakup Pasha) from the south. According to Dhimitër Frëngu, Arnauti's army consisted of 16,000 men, while according to Fan Noli and Marin Barleti the number of soldiers was around 12,000.

== Battle ==
On 28 October 1465, Jakup Arnauti leading an army made up of 12,000-16,000 soldiers including 2,000 infantrymen and archers and 10,000 cavalry began raiding the settlements of Ndronik, Pezë, Lalm and Tirana while on his way to "meet-up" with his fellow general Ballaban Badera before he was stopped near the village of Kashari by Skanderbeg's army made up of 11,000 men consisting of 7,000 cavalry together with 4,000 infantry and archers. Skanderbeg sent a small contingent of 500 cavalry to the Ottoman centre, which shortly engaged with the Ottomans before retreating back, "baiting" the Ottoman centre to pursuit them. The contingent was pursued by the entire Ottoman army which reached the Albanian lines and began to engage them, leading to fighting breaking out. Both Jakup Pasha and Skanderbeg fought on the frontline of the battle and in the midst of the fighting, Skanderbeg charged at Jakup Arnauti, dealing him a blow to the neck and killing him. Upon seeing this, many of the Ottoman soldiers retreated; however, they were pursued by the Albanian troops and most of them were killed, while the Ottoman soldiers that didn't retreat were encircled by the Albanian cavalry and killed.

The Ottoman casualties were around 10,000, while according to Marin Barleti, the casualties on the side of the League of Lezhë were minimal.

== Aftermath ==
The victorious Albanian army marched into Krujë, where the doubting populace greeted them with great cheer. The following year the city was besieged by the Ottomans.
