= Siege of Krujë =

Siege of Krujë refers to four attempts (with one decisive victory) of the Ottoman Empire to capture Krujë in Albania during the 15th century.

- First siege of Krujë, 1450
- Second siege of Krujë, 1466–67
- Third siege of Krujë, 1467
- Fourth siege of Krujë (the fall of Krujë), 1477–78
