= Battle of Meçad (1465) =

Albanian-Ottoman battle

Coordinates: 41.525°N 20.5275°E

Battle of Meçad Beteja e Meçadit
- Part of the Albanian–Ottoman Wars (1432–1479)
Date	June 1465
Location	near Oranik in Upper Dibra (modern day Debar in North Macedonia)
Result	Albanian victory

Belligerents
League of Lezhë	Ottoman Empire

Commanders and leaders
Skanderbeg	Ballaban Pasha

Strength
10,000	10,000

Casualties and losses
Unknown	Unknown

The Battle of Meçad (Albanian: Beteja e Meçadit) took place in July 1465 between Skanderbeg's Albanian forces and Ballaban Badera's Ottoman forces. Skanderbeg had been leading a war against the Ottoman Empire for over two decades and Ballaban Badera was an Ottoman captain of Albanian origin who had been recruited through the devşirme system. Ballaban planned to catch Skanderbeg's camp in a surprise when he was away. Skanderbeg had been warned of the stratagem, however, and surrounded the Ottoman camp instead. When Ballaban ordered his army out, the Albanians ambushed and routed them. Ballaban returned a month later and the month afterwards, but was defeated both times.

== Background ==
In April 1465, Ballaban Badera, an Ottoman sanjakbey of the Sanjak of Ohrid of Albanian origin, had been defeated at the Battle of Vaikal by Skanderbeg, although at a great cost. Skanderbeg had been leading a war against the Ottoman Empire for over twenty years. Ballaban was favored by Sultan Mehmed II who saw that a native Albanian would be useful in defeating an Albanian rebellion. Ballaban's appointment was a calculated act of social revolution, encouraging other Albanians to join the Ottoman army. In July 1465, Mehmed assigned Ballaban to an army with which to invade Albania.

== Campaign ==
Before the campaign, Ballaban presented Skanderbeg with expensive gifts. Skanderbeg responded by giving Ballaban a pickaxe and a plow to remind Ballaban of his peasant Albanian origins. Ballaban, in return for the gift he had received, tried to finish the campaign as quickly as he could. Ballaban tried to bribe an Albanian camp in Meçad, near Oranik, but Skanderbeg, who had been farther north, was warned of the movements and returned to fight Ballaban. He marched in through Ohrid. Ballaban was not aware of Skanderbeg's return and still prepared for the attack. Skanderbeg had surrounded the Ottomans in Meçad and when Ballaban ordered his attack, he found himself surrounded. On one side, they were attacked by the Albanian cavalry and on the other, by the Italian volunteers.

== Aftermath ==
The Albanians won a decisive victory. Turkish flags fell into Albanian hands and few escaped. Ballaban returned to Constantinople and Mehmed thus assigned him to an army of 20,000 which was again defeated by Skanderbeg in July 1465. In August, Ballaban launched his largest campaign against Albania. The Ottoman army consisted of 40,000 men altogether, but it too was defeated by Skanderbeg. The next year, however, Mehmed launched a total war against Albanian arms, completely devastating the country and laying siege to Krujë.
