= Siege of Krujë (1477–1478) =

Fourth siege of Krujë

Fourth siege of Krujë Rrethimi i katërt i Krujës
- Part of the Ottoman–Venetian War (1463–1479) and the Albanian–Ottoman Wars (1432–1479)
- Siege/Battle of Kruje (1477-1478)
Date	Spring 1477 – 16 June 1478
Location	Krujë, Albania 41°30′27″N 19°47′42″E
Result	Ottoman victory
Territorial changes	Ottomans capture Krujë

Belligerents
Republic of Venice; Albanian forces allied with Venice	Ottoman Empire

Commanders and leaders
Pietro Vitturi; Francesco Contarini †; Nikollë Dukagjini	Evrenosoğlu Ahmed Bey; Mehmed II

Strength
Around 250 soldiers and 500 inhabitants garrisoned	Unknown

Casualties and losses
More than 1,000 reported in the September 1477 battle	Unknown

The fourth siege of Krujë (Ottoman Turkish: آقچه حصار نك چهارم محاصره‌سى; Albanian: Rrethimi i katërt i Krujës) was an Ottoman siege of the Venetian-held fortress of Krujë in Albania from spring 1477 until 16 June 1478. Beginning in the spring of 1477, Ottoman forces under Evrenosoğlu Ahmed Bey blockaded the fortress and attempted to prevent supplies and reinforcements from reaching its garrison.

In September 1477, a combined Venetian–Albanian army attempted to relieve Krujë. The relief force initially drove the Ottoman troops from their camp, but the Ottomans returned after the victors had dispersed to plunder it. The resulting counterattack routed the relief army and killed the Venetian commander Francesco Contarini. Among the Albanian leaders accompanying the relief force was Nikollë Dukagjini.

The failure of the relief effort left Krujë largely isolated. After more than a year of blockade, its supplies were exhausted and the defenders were reduced by severe famine. Sultan Mehmed II personally entered Albania in the spring of 1478. With no realistic prospect of relief, Krujë surrendered in mid-June and was taken by the Ottomans on 16 June 1478. Its fall ended several decades in which the fortress had repeatedly resisted major Ottoman attacks and allowed Mehmed to concentrate his campaign on the remaining Venetian strongholds in northern Albania, particularly Shkodër.

== Background ==
Krujë had been one of the principal centres of the resistance led by Skanderbeg against the Ottoman Empire. The fortress had survived earlier Ottoman campaigns, including major sieges in 1450, 1466–1467, and another Ottoman expedition in 1467. Its position on a rocky height overlooking the coastal plain made direct assault difficult and gave it considerable strategic importance.

The political circumstances had changed substantially by the 1470s. Skanderbeg died in January 1468, and Venice assumed an increasingly direct role in the defence of the remaining anti-Ottoman positions in Albania. Krujë was consequently defended as a Venetian fortress, although Albanian soldiers and nobles continued to participate in the fighting.

The wider conflict formed part of the long Ottoman–Venetian War begun in 1463. By the later 1470s Venice was under considerable military pressure throughout the eastern Mediterranean and the Balkans. Ottoman forces had already attacked Shkodër in 1474, while Ottoman raids penetrated Venetian territories elsewhere. Krujë and Shkodër were among the principal Venetian positions still obstructing Ottoman consolidation in Albania.

== Siege ==
The blockade of Krujë began in the spring of 1477. According to historian Zarij Bešić, the fortress contained only about 250 infantrymen and approximately 500 inhabitants, with food and ammunition sufficient for roughly six months.

Ottoman forces under Evrenosoğlu Ahmed Bey, an important frontier commander operating in Albania, surrounded the fortress and sought to cut its communications with the Venetian possessions on the Adriatic coast. Rather than depending exclusively upon a direct assault against Krujë's difficult terrain and fortifications, the Ottoman operation developed into a prolonged blockade intended to exhaust the garrison's supplies.

Venice attempted to maintain contact with the fortress and organise forces for its relief. The Venetian commander inside Krujë was Pietro Vitturi, who was assisted by the constable Giuliano da San Scorbaro and the voivode Vuk Curani.

=== Battle of 6 September 1477 ===
The principal attempt to break the siege culminated in a battle near Krujë on 6 September 1477. According to Giuseppe Valentini's reconstruction of the battle, the relief forces were divided into two bodies. One operated on the plain toward the Adriatic under Francesco Contarini, the Venetian provveditore, accompanied by the paymaster Giacomo da Mosto. A second force, numbering more than 2,000 men, approached from the direction of Shkodër and Lezhë. It included approximately 500 Italian light cavalry under Antonazzo Deci and Lodovico da Castello di Tiferno, Italian infantry under Carolino and Leone Illirico, and Albanian auxiliaries led by Nikollë Dukagjini.

Ottoman forces were encamped in the area of Zezë, on the plain below Krujë. Valentini gives their strength as approximately 8,000 men. The two armies met around midday between Luzë and Zezë, near today's Fushë-Krujë. The Venetian-Albanian cavalry was formed in a square, while Ottoman cavalry repeatedly advanced and withdrew. Infantrymen moved out from the formation to attack the Ottoman horses before returning to the protection of the main body. Arquebusiers and crossbowmen also fired against the Ottoman troops. By evening the Ottoman force withdrew in the direction of Tirana, leaving its camp behind. The defenders of Krujë simultaneously made a sortie from the fortress and captured two Ottoman fortified positions controlling the road between Zezë and Krujë. These positions contained provisions, providing a temporary success for the besieged garrison.

The victory, however, was short-lived. After entering the abandoned Ottoman camp, elements of the relief army began plundering it. While the commanders debated whether to remain there overnight, the Ottoman troops regrouped and unexpectedly returned. The Venetian–Albanian troops were caught dispersed and unprepared. The infantry was surrounded and much of the cavalry fled toward the Ishëm River through the surrounding woodland and marshes. Valentini records losses of more than a thousand men. Contarini and several other officers were killed or lost during the rout. The relief attempt therefore failed to break the Ottoman blockade.

=== Continued blockade ===
Following the September defeat, the Ottoman blockade continued through the winter of 1477–1478. Krujë's defensive position made a frontal assault difficult, but the same geography also made the fortress dependent upon stored provisions or outside relief. With the Venetian relief army defeated, the Ottoman forces were able to maintain pressure on the routes leading toward the castle. Bešić states that the defenders had possessed provisions for only about six months when the siege began.

The failure at Krujë occurred while Venice was facing Ottoman pressure on several fronts. Ottoman raids reached Venetian territories in the northern Adriatic, while negotiations between Venice and Mehmed II repeatedly failed to end the war. By early 1478 the Venetian government was increasingly willing to negotiate territorial concessions, including Krujë, but Ottoman demands grew as Venice's military position worsened.

By the final phase of the siege, famine had become severe inside Krujë. The Historia Turchesca describes the inhabitants as having consumed dogs and cats, followed by herbs and roots, and eventually boiled old boots and shoes when ordinary provisions had been exhausted.

=== Surrender ===
In the spring of 1478, Sultan Mehmed II personally led an Ottoman campaign into Albania. Krujë had already been under blockade for more than a year when the main Ottoman campaign began. Venice was simultaneously attempting to negotiate an end to the war. The republic was prepared to surrender several disputed territories, including Krujë, but Mehmed demanded additional concessions, particularly Shkodër. Negotiations failed while the Ottoman army continued its advance. With its provisions exhausted and no relief force capable of reaching it, the garrison entered negotiations for surrender. Krujë was taken by the Ottomans on 16 June 1478.

The treatment of the defenders after the surrender is also reported differently by the surviving sources. Tursun Beg states that the defenders of Krujë were put to the sword. However, this cannot have applied to all of them: Machiel Kiel notes that in February 1479 the Venetian Senate was negotiating with the Ottomans for the release of a group of Venetians who had been imprisoned following the capture of Krujë.

== Aftermath ==
The fall of Krujë removed one of the principal fortified positions that had resisted Ottoman expansion in Albania since the time of Skanderbeg. After its conquest, the Ottomans repaired the fortress and incorporated Krujë, known in Ottoman administration as Akçahisar, into their provincial system. The town became the centre of a kaza, and a mosque and bath were constructed within the fortress. Muslim settlers were also established there.

The capture nevertheless did not immediately end Venetian resistance in Albania. Mehmed's main objective shifted toward the remaining Venetian fortresses in northern Albania. Drisht and Lezhë fell during the 1478 campaign, while Mehmed personally concentrated substantial forces against Shkodër. Despite heavy Ottoman bombardment and assaults, Shkodër resisted throughout the siege of 1478. Venice, however, being financially and militarily exhausted after sixteen years of war, eventually concluded the Treaty of Constantinople with the Ottoman Empire on 25 January 1479. Under the settlement, Venice ceded Shkodër and other territories to Mehmed II.

== Sources ==
- Bešić, Zarij M. (1970). Istorija Crne Gore (in Serbian). Vol. II, part 2. Titograd: Redakcija za istoriju Crne Gore.
- Valentini, Giuseppe (2014) [1941]. "Passeggiate storiche nell'Alta Albania". Palaver (in Italian). 3 (1): 89–160.
- Sabellico, Marcantonio (1556). "Decadis tertiae, Liber X". Historiae rerum Venetarum ab urbe condita (in Latin). Basel.
- Setton, Kenneth M. (1978). The Papacy and the Levant (1204–1571). Vol. II: The Fifteenth Century. Philadelphia: American Philosophical Society. ISBN 0-87169-127-2.
- İnalcık, Halil (2003). "Mehmed II". TDV İslâm Ansiklopedisi (in Turkish).
- Bellingeri, Giampiero (2010). "Due manoscritti veneziani di storia turco-persiana, una fonte ottomana e G.M. Angiolello". In Pedrini, Giovanni; Veladiano, Nico (eds.). Itinera Orientalia. Itinerari veneti tra Oriente e Occidente. Relazioni di viaggio tra identità e alterità (in Italian). Vicenza: Editrice Veneta. pp. 23–94.
- Babinger, Franz (1992). Hickman, William C. (ed.). Mehmed the Conqueror and His Time. Translated by Manheim, Ralph. Princeton: Princeton University Press. ISBN 978-0-691-01078-6.
- Kiel, Machiel (2002). "Kruya". TDV İslâm Ansiklopedisi (in Turkish). Vol. 26. pp. 293–295.
