= Ballaban's campaign of 1465 =

Military conflict

Ballaban's Campaign Fushata e Ballabanit
- Part of Ottoman wars in Europe
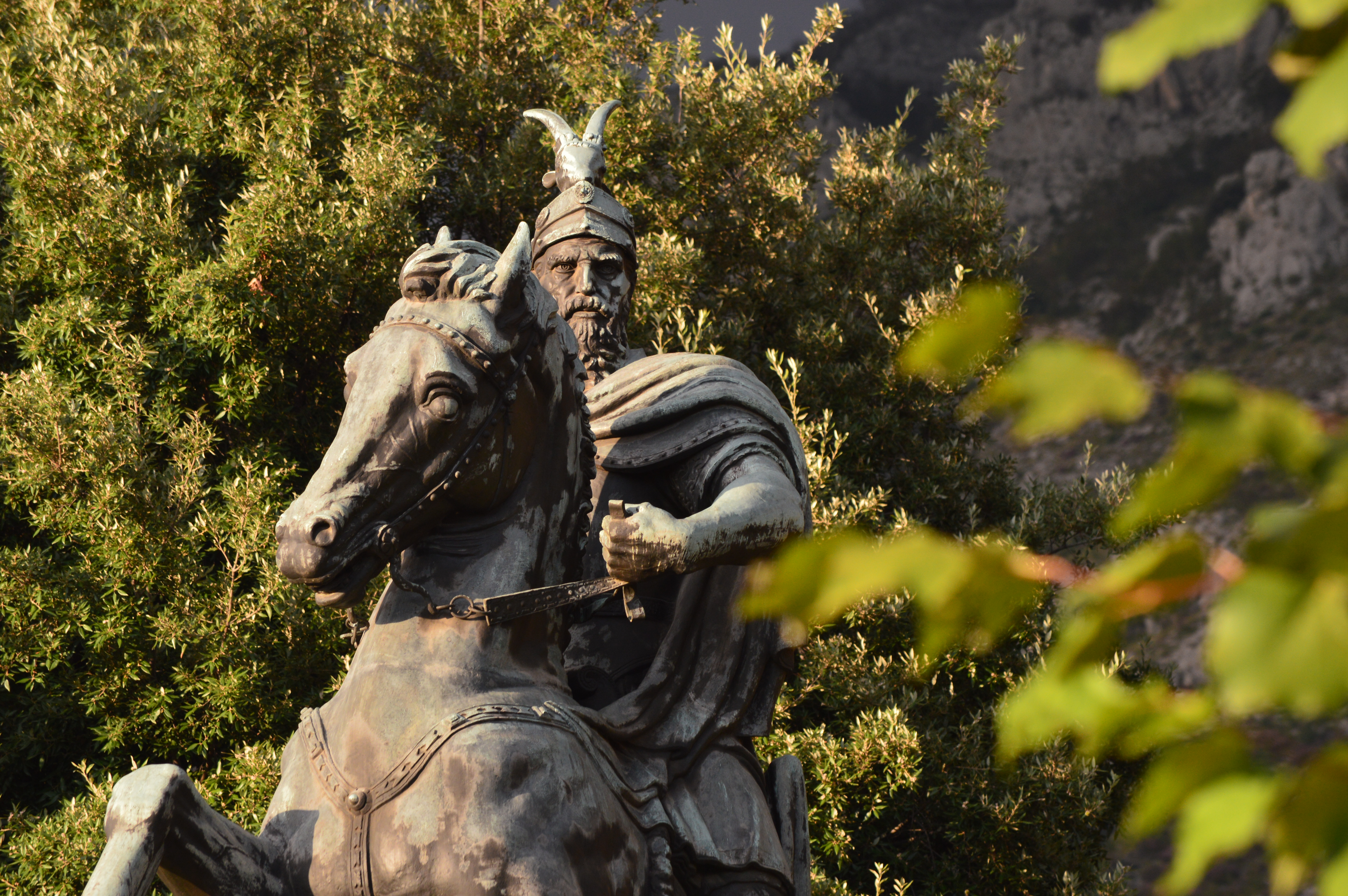
- Skanderbeg Monument in Krujë, Albania
Date	August 1465
Location	Eastern and Central Albania
Result	Albanian victory

Belligerents
League of Lezhë	Ottoman Empire

Commanders and leaders
Skanderbeg	Ballaban Pasha; Jakup Pasha †

Strength
12,000	Ballaban: 24,000; Arnauti: 16,000; Total: 40,000

Casualties and losses
Unknown	24,000 killed, wounded or captured

In August 1465, Ballaban Badera, an Albanian-born janissary who served as the sanjakbey of the Sanjak of Ohrid, launched his largest campaign against Skanderbeg. He had been defeated in the battle of Vajkal in April of the same year. Ballaban had previously inflicted severe casualties on Skanderbeg's forces and soon received high favor from Mehmed II. Ballaban and Jakup Arnauti, both being Albanian peasants by birth, were chosen to lead a joint-campaign against Skanderbeg's forces. According to some scholars, this act of inclusion by the Sultan was a promotion of a social revolution within Albania to wean forces away from Skanderbeg.

Whatever the motives, the Ottoman army marched forth with two separate forces: one from the south under Arnauti and the other, under Ballaban's personal command, from the east. Applying a pincer movement, the goal of this action was to meet in central Albania in full force, storming what was supposed to be a hesitant Albanian defense. Skanderbeg, however, defeated both armies thoroughly by marching against Ballaban's column first, defeating it and engaging Arnauti's column afterwards with the same result. The victory brought great joy and relief to the Albanian people, who had been expecting a serious defeat. Despite the tremendous results, Mehmed II marched forth again the next year, bringing great devastation to the country.

== Campaigns of 1465 ==
Ballaban had been given command of two separate forces to march against Skanderbeg in 1465. The first was defeated at Vajkal, but the Albanian victory came to a great cost. Many of Skanderbeg's most trusted generals had been captured and sent to Constantinople. They were given the choice of converting to Islam or of dying. All of them chose the latter and their bodies were mutilated and thrown to the dogs.

A new army was assembled and sent again to Albania. This time it was defeated near Oranik, but at great risk to Skanderbeg's life. He found himself cut off from the rest of his troops (except for his personal bodyguard) and was cut down by an Ottoman soldier. The Albanian army began to panic, but Skanderbeg rose and managed to cut his way out despite his heavy wounds. Ballaban, after suffering his second consecutive defeat, returned to Constantinople, where the Sultan continued to support him due to what Ballaban called the "will of the stars".

== Campaign ==
=== Prelude ===
Before he began his campaign, Ballaban offered Skanderbeg several gifts. Instead of accepting them, Skanderbeg sent back a pickaxe and a plough to remind Ballaban of his origins as a peasant, showing that it would have been more noble to have stayed so than to turn against one's own people. Ballaban was offended and made an oath of vengeance. Ballaban planned to march two armies into Albania. Ballaban's force of 24,000 men was to march from Debar and Jakup Arnauti's force of 16,000 men from Berat. The plan was to march to Krujë and take it after Skanderbeg would have moved against one of the two armies. From there, the other would move into Skanderbeg's rear and hopefully annihilate his army.

Many Albanian nobles allied to Skanderbeg began to advocate a purely defensive campaign to thwart the Ottoman invasion. But Skanderbeg felt that he must, at all costs, prevent the linking up of the two armies sent against him, especially now that he had received fresh troops and supplies from Ferdinand I of Naples, bringing his forces' numbers to 12,000 men. He therefore marched against Ballaban first.

=== Battle of Vajkal ===
Skanderbeg bivouacked his forces near Oranik, in the fields of Vajkal, where Ballaban was to march. Ballaban, before moving onto the fields, sent out men to Skanderbeg's posts to bribe them into not going out to guard during a late hour. Skanderbeg, however, expected such a stratagem and surreptitiously moved his forces into the wooded areas around the area where Ballaban's army would be moving to; 8,000 cavalrymen and 4,000 infantry were set up on both sides. He marched out for eight miles to find Ballaban's army and upon seeing Ballaban, the latter ordered all of his forces to capture Skanderbeg and defeat his army afterwards. After reaching his men, Skanderbeg exhorted them to fight bravely in order to finish off the Turks. He soon split up his forces into four groups: the first to Tanush Thopia; the second to Pal Engjëlli's brother in-law; the third to Zaharia Gropa; and the last to himself.

The Ottoman forces were wary of following him, so with his own group he continually harassed the Ottoman soldiers until they were driven into his chosen field of battle. Once the Turks had neared, all of the Albanian forces sprang out of their positions, encircling the Turks. The latter attempted to hold out, but they could not resist and so they took to flight, leaving many dead and wounded behind. Ballaban, however, managed to escape by hiding out in a secure place with a portion of his forces, waiting to escape as soon as the Albanians marched off. Ballaban got his opportunity when Skanderbeg received news from his sister that Jakup Arnauti's forces had reached central Albania, destroying much of the land they marched through. Skanderbeg immediately set off and Ballaban returned to the Sultan defeated.

=== Battle of Kashar ===
Arnauti marched into Albania expecting to meet his colleague Ballaban, but instead he was about to meet Skanderbeg. Before setting off for the march, Skanderbeg exhorted to his men that since they had already beaten an army twice their size, they should expect a quick victory over an army of only 16,000 men. The Albanians moved toward Kashar, near today's Tirana, where Arnauti's forces were waiting. Upon reaching the place, Skanderbeg sent out 500 cavalrymen to provoke Arnauti into making a rash decision. Skanderbeg's intentions were fulfilled and Arnauti split his forces into three in order to surround and defeat the Albanian cavalrymen, who continued to be chased without being stopped. When the Ottoman forces were spotted by the Albanians, a powerful charge was launched onto the unsuspecting Turks, resulting in an initially fierce battle. Here, Jakup Arnauti was spotted by Skanderbeg in battle, and the latter struck the former with his spear right below the chin. Arnauti's death devastated Ottoman morale, resulting in most of the force fleeing and being pursued by the Albanians, who inflicted heavy casualties.

== Aftermath ==
Ottoman casualties were very heavy with estimates of the time going upwards of 24,000 dead, wounded, and captured. As usual, Skanderbeg authorized the taking of loot. The victorious army marched into Kruja, where the doubting populace greeted them with great cheer. Skanderbeg notified ambassadors who were nearby of his victory, allotting much of the loot captured by his army to them. The next year, Mehmed II marched into Albania with a great number and again besieged Kruja. Ballaban would be left with much of the Sultan's forces since the latter went to build the Elbasan fortress. Skanderbeg, again, managed to extricate himself, this time managing to bring about the death of his rival.
