= Pal Engjëlli =

Catholic Albanian archbishop

- Archbishop of Durrës and the Illyrian Conservator; Judge of the Illyrian Region
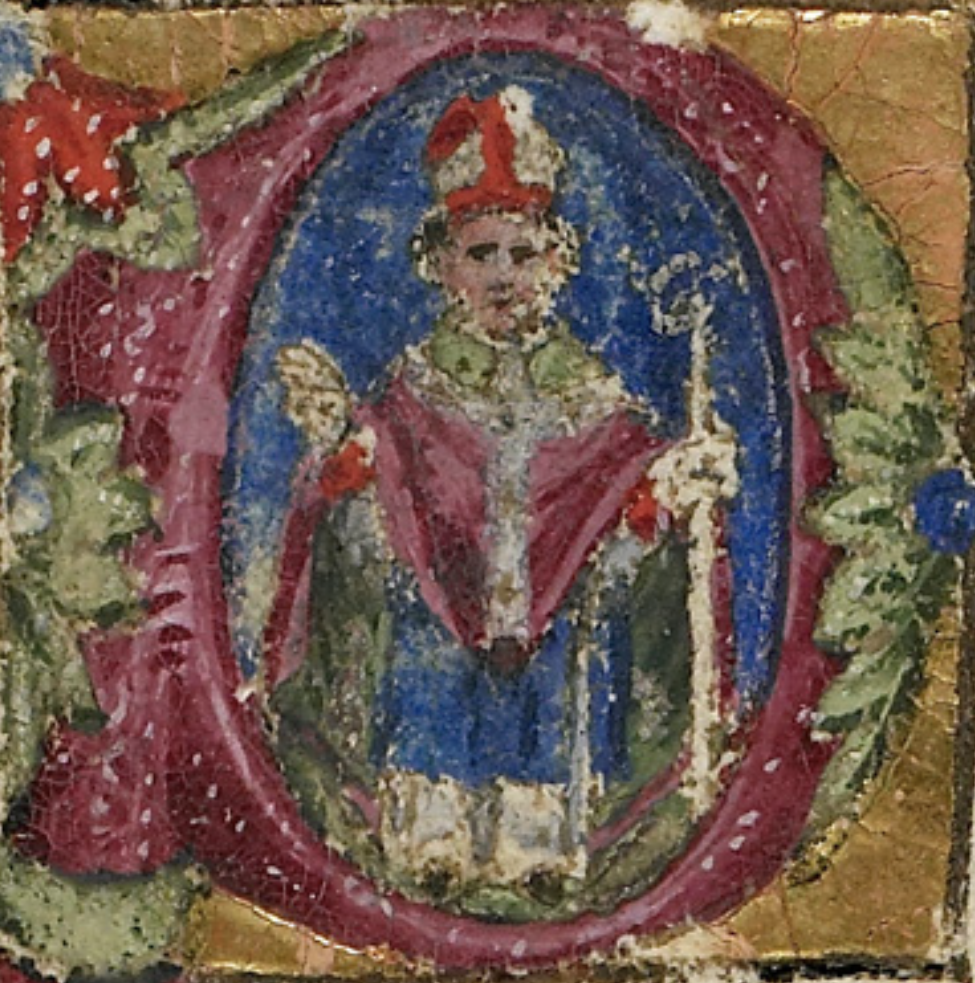
- Miniature portrait from 1464 of Pal Engjëlli.
- Church: Roman Catholic
- Archdiocese: Durrës
- In office: 1460

Personal details
- Born: 1416
- Died: Before 13 March 1469
- Denomination: Catholic Church

Pal Engjëlli (Latin: Pauli Angeli; 1416–1470) was an Albanian prelate of the Roman Catholic Church who served as archbishop of Durrës from 1460 to 1469. In 1462 he wrote the oldest indisputed known text in Albanian.

Pal is reported to have been a friend, co-worker and close counselor of Skanderbeg. As his envoy, he frequently traveled abroad, seeking aid in the war against the Ottoman Empire. Pal managed to convince Lekë Dukagjini to leave the Ottomans and later reconcile with Skanderbeg, and also to convince Skanderbeg to violate an armistice signed with the Ottomans.

== Early life ==
Pal Engjëlli was a part of the Engjëlli family. Born in 1416, according to Albanian writer Marin Barleti, Pal hailed from the medieval city of Drivasto. His father was Andrea I Engjëlli and his mother was Dorothea Arianiti. He had a younger brother named Pjetër I Engjëlli who married Lucia Spani, the daughter of Alex Spani, the Albanian Lord of Drivasto. According to the Italian ecclesiastical historian Daniele Farlati, he had spent his youth in Constantinople and later sought refuge in Albania after the city was captured by the Ottomans. According to modern Swiss historian Oliver Schmitt, Farlati's claim "cannot be verified".

== Ecclesiastical career ==
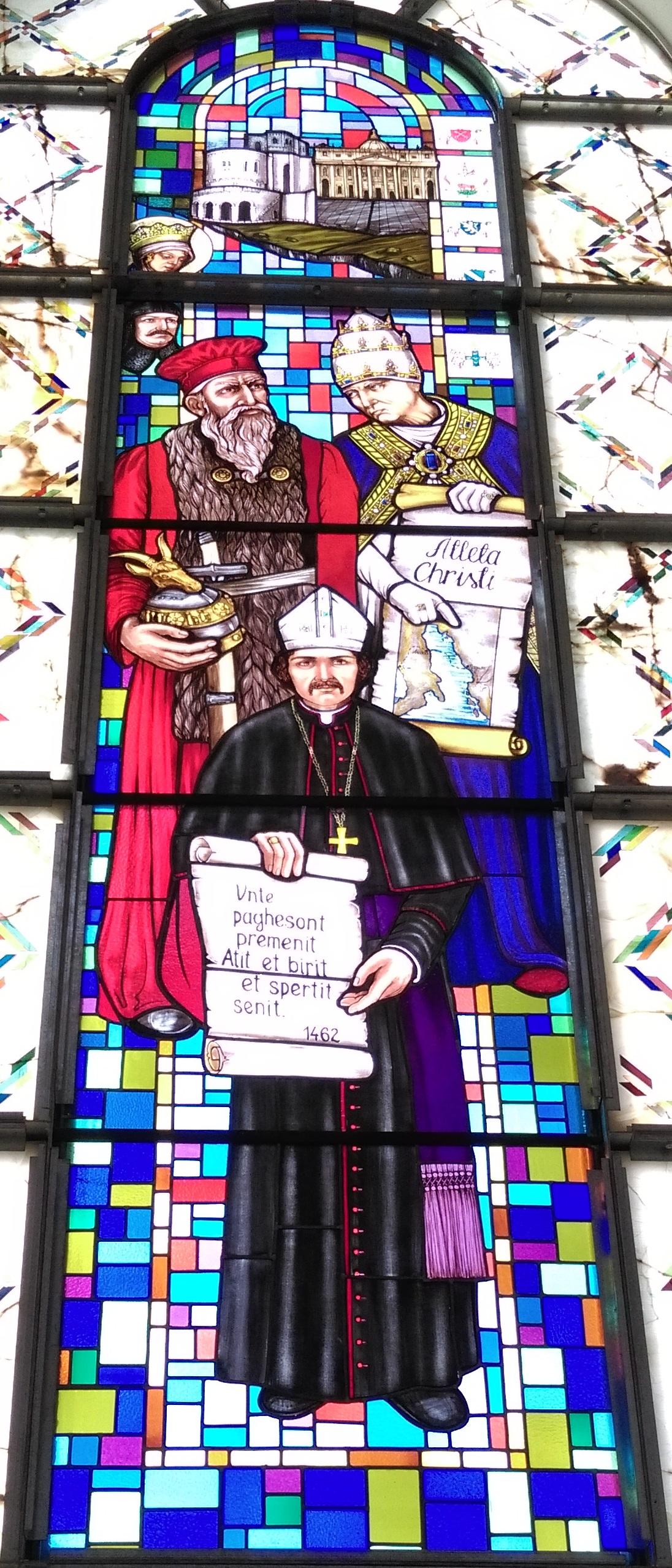
Modern stained glass window of Pal Engjëlli (centre with black robes) depicting the baptismal formula.

=== Early documentations ===
Pal may have first been mentioned in 1440 as bishop of Šas and bishop of Drisht in 1444 and 1445 as Paulus Dussus. Historian Robert Elsie notes that it remains uncertain as to whether or not Paulus Dussus and Paulus Angelus (Pal Engjëlli) are the same person.

Pal is first indisputably mentioned in April 1456, when, as a presbyter from Drisht, accompanied the Uniate Archbishop of Krajina (a historical-geographical region of Croatia) to Rome.

According to the Byzantine historian and Albanologist Giuseppe Valentini, Pal was commissioned on April 17, 1456, during the organization of the Crusades by Pope Callixtus III to collect supplies for the Crusaders in Albania, Dalmatia, and Serbia. The funds collected by him and with the assistance of others were presented to Skanderbeg on November 17, 1457. During 1457 he was also documented to have been the archdeacon of Durrës.

During the papacy of Pius II, he received the Latin title of "Iudex Illyrice regionis" (Judge of the Illyrian region). He styled himself as "Paulus Angelus miseratione divina archiepiscopus Dyrrhachiensis et Illyricae ac conservator" (Paulus Angelus, by the grace of God, Archbishop of Durrës and Illyrian Conservator) in documents that he personally issued.

=== Ordination as Archbishop of Durrës ===
On March 19, 1460, Pal was appointed as the 31st Archbishop of Durrës and the Illyrian region (Latin: "archiepiscopum Dyrrhachiensem et Illyricae regionis"). His appointment as Archbishop made him the leader of the Catholic Church in Central Albania. It is documented that 13 days later on 2 April 1460, Pal personally obligated himself to pay 50 florins to the cathedral of Durrës. Fifteen days later, he also committed to pay 60 florins for the Benedictine monastery of St. John of Stivalio (present-day Shtoj) in the Roman Catholic Diocese of Drivasto which had been granted to him in commenda. The document refers to the obligatio, meaning the formal promise to pay a fixed sum as a tax for receiving a church benefice; the actual payment of the promised sum was called solutio. He also issued the statutes of the cathedral chapter of Drisht in November 1464 at the Benedictine monastery of St. Theodor of Elohiero near Durrës.

=== Convention of the Synod of Mat ===
When Pal assumed his office in Venetian Durrës, the city – with its important harbour – had lost its previous ancient reputation but was considered one of the only remaining refuge in Albania as the Ottoman front drew ever closer. A petition submitted to Pope Pius II on August 4, 1459, by the Dominican friar Blasio de Litio (a confidant of Skanderbeg) reveals that the immediate hinterland of Durrës had been exhausted by years of Ottoman pillaging; the Church and its representatives bore the brunt of the suffering, while monasteries and places of worship had fallen into ruin. There was a shortage of priests, and the Catholic faith itself was in danger of collapse within the region. A few days after the aforementioned petition was brought forward by the Dominican, Pius II commissioned him to reorganise the order using Durrës as the base of operations. Accompanied by two or three other friars, he was tasked with providing active support to the faithful in Albania, extending as far east as the Black Drin as well as in Rascia and Serbia to the north (though not in Venice) and in other lands bordering Ottoman territory. His mission included preaching the crusade, threatening severe penalties against apostates and those defecting to the Ottomans, and eradicating the superstition that was widespread even among Christians.

When Pal, during an apostolic visit inside the Diocese of Lisiensis in the district of Mat, having observed that the Dominicans' efforts had made little progress and that the war-torn land required fundamental reform, he convened a church synod in the late autumn of 1462 at the Church of the Holy Trinity in Stellushi, near Burrel in the district of Mat. Attendees included Andreas, the Bishop of Lisiensis, as well as abbots, rectors, officials, and all the priests of the Diocese. In 1915, the Romanian historian Nicolae Iorga discovered a 16th-century manuscript housed in the Biblioteca Medicea Laurenziana in Florence, Italy, revealing that Pal had drafted the "Constitutiones" (Constitutions) of the Synod on November 8, 1462. Pal strove to bring the Albanian population back into the fold of the Catholic Church and sought to ensure ecclesiastical order through the imposition of fines (ranging from 5 to 20 hyperpyra) for acts of Apostasy.

Formula e Pagëzimit

Un'te paghesont' pr'emenit t'Atit e t'Birit e t'Spertit Senit

The synod attempted to restore church life during a period of great hardship and struggle for the Catholic Church in Albania. In the synod, Pal's most known work was the formula e pagëzimit. The synod permitted the use of Albanian vernacular to be used privately in the Baptismal formula for dying children that were unable to attend church for Baptism and was the earliest in-disputed text written in the Albanian language. The text was written in the Gheg Albanian dialect, using the Latin script and is dated to 8 November 1462. The document containing the baptismal formula is held in the Biblioteca Medicea Laurenziana, Florence, Italy.

== Career in Skanderbeg's court ==
=== Across European state courts ===
Pal served as Skanderbeg's advisor and envoy from 1464 onwards and was recommended by Skanderbeg to Italian princes since also held clear ideas regarding the struggle against the Ottomans. To this end, he focused on fortifying the port city of Durrës and offered 8,000 workers to the Venetian bailo of Durrës. He also travelled to the republic of Ragusa and to the courts of Milan and Naples acting as an intermediary for his patron and the republic of Venice. As Skanderbeg's intimate advisor and ambassador, Pal travelled with Alessio Albanese to the court of Francesco Sforza in early June 1464 to request assistance for the war against the Ottomans. However, beyond words of encouragement, the Duke could contribute only a few gifts of courtesy, such as "three coats of mail for his lord (Skanderbeg)."

=== In the Venetian Senate ===
The Venetians placed full confidence in Pal and viewed him as the key figure for reconciliation with Skanderbeg. A report sent to the Venetian Senate on July 25, 1465, by Gabriele Trevisan, the Venetian Governor-General in Albania reveals that Pal spared neither effort nor expense, as he is said to have already spent tens of thousands of ducats by that time. Through his efforts in the struggle against the Ottomans, he had persuaded Skanderbeg to return to the Christian camp in order to align himself with the Venetian Signoria on August 20, 1463, and to resume the war against the Ottomans with whom he had concluded peace on April 27, 1463, and engaging with them in the Battle of Vaikal in April 1465, the Battle of Ohrid in September 14–15, 1464, and the Battle of Meçad in June 1465. In April 1466, Pal was in Venice as Skanderbeg's envoy to present his demands: that he be granted supreme command over the Venetian troops in Albania and that his son, Gjon Kastrioti II, be placed under his command. The requests made by Pal were accepted.

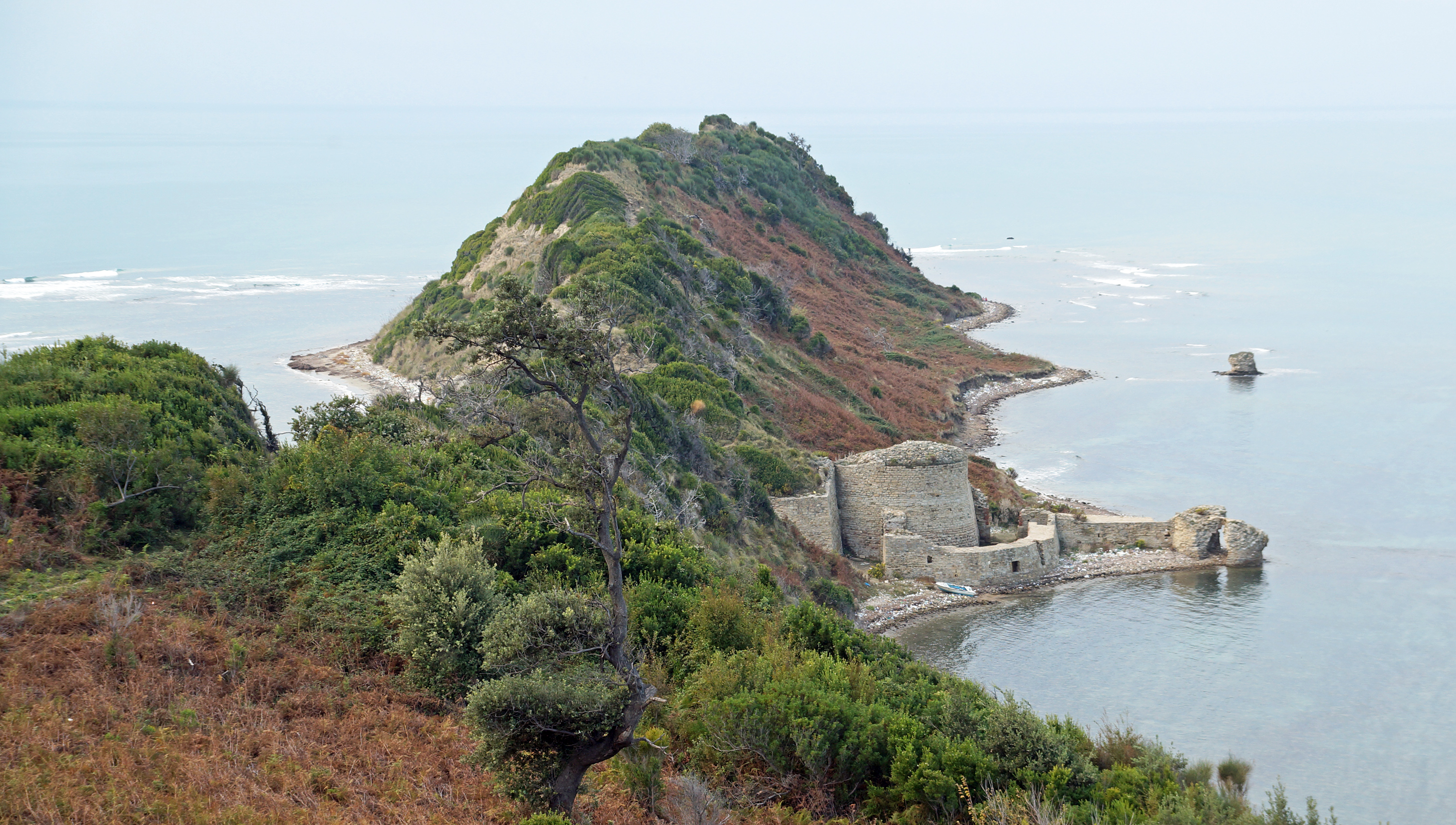
Castle of Rodon in Albania.

The Ottoman Sultan Mehmet II ordered the construction of a major fortress in Elbasan. This fortress, intended to serve as a supply hub, was to be the base for attacks on the still-Christian regions of central and northern Albania. Skanderbeg was well–aware of the threat posed by the Ottomans in Elbasan and in August 1466, he commissioned Pal to alert the Venetian Senate about the situation. Further news regarding the archbishop's activities emerged when he appeared before the Venetian Senate on October 26, 1467, together with Skanderbeg's son Gjon II, to discuss the provisioning of Kruja and assistance with fortifying Rodoni Castle to make a request regarding the position where Skanderbeg had entrenched himself. The senators put the two envoys off by pointing to the time of year.

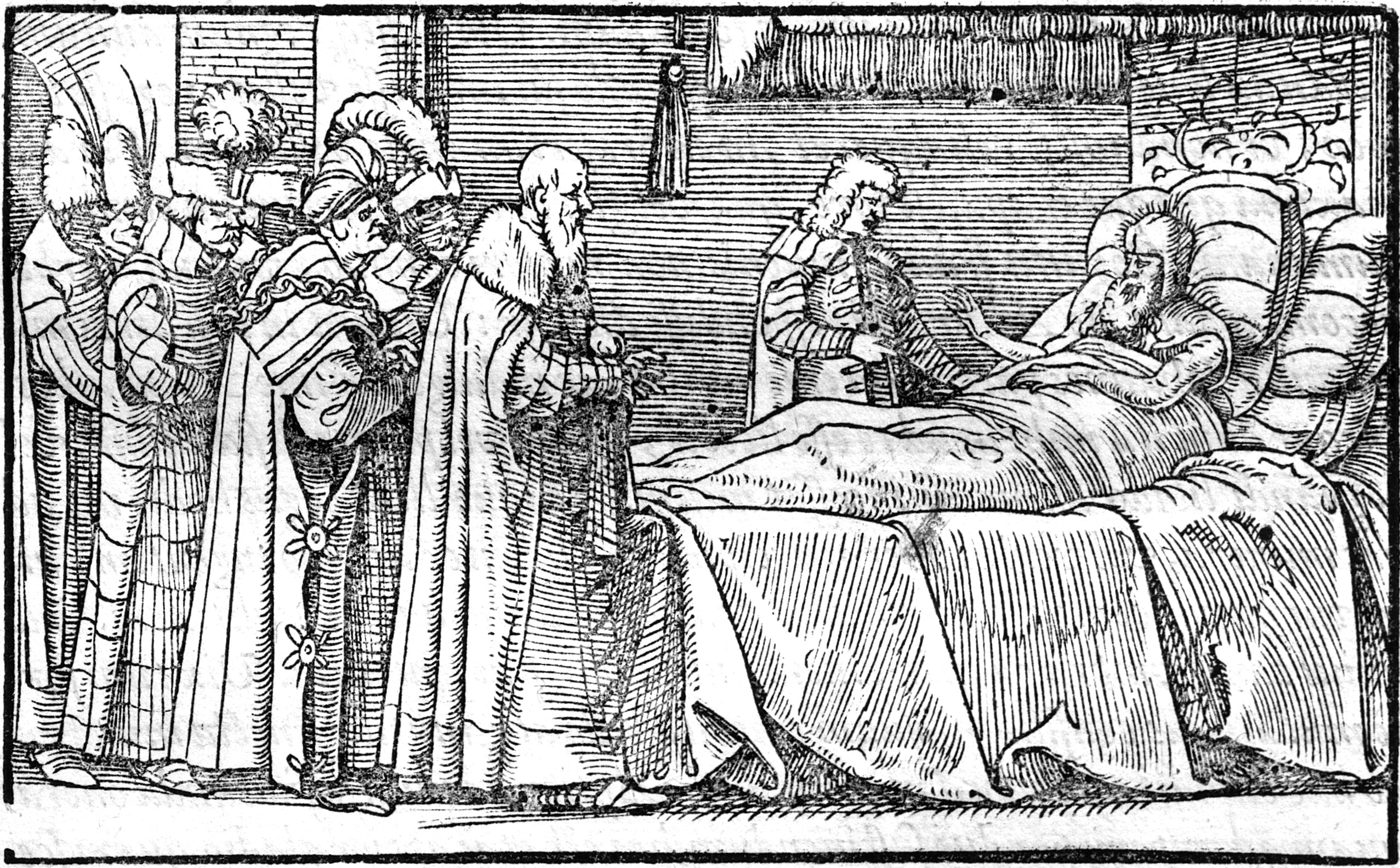
16th–century German engraving of Skanderbeg's death

Pal then spent the following months in Venice where the news of Skanderbeg's death reached him on 13 February 1468. The Senate resolved that Pal had to return to Albania ideally on the very next day to exert his influence over Skanderbeg's widow, his son, his retainers and to attempted to bring them back to order from chaos. The Senate authorized payment to the Archbishop of approximately 220 ducats, a sum the Republic appeared to owe him, and decided to dispatch him on his mission with the promise of a reward. They intended for him to collaborate with Francesco Capello, the newly appointed Venetian provveditore in Albania—a region to which they also resolved to send an additional 200 infantrymen and 100 artillerymen.

With the death of Skanderbeg, Pal Engjëlli disappeared from the diplomatic stage. Venice stood alone and the Albanian lords appeared in Venice only as dependent petitioners and refugees.

== Death ==
According to Oliver Schmitt, Pal died before March 24, 1469—the date of a petition submitted not by the Archbishop, but by Gjon Strez Maramonte (known as Balšić), the former lord of Misia, in which the borders of Skanderbeg's state were defined.

Nikolaus Barbuti was ordained as the new Archbishop of Durrës on May 5, 1469.

== Character and personality ==
Pal was impressed by the ancient past of the port–city of Durrës. He had learned the Greek and Latin languages in addition to have reading the ancient classics. He maintained close ties with the Italian renaissance humanism and was a well–respected figure within the Roman Curia. He was known to have been held at high–esteem by his compatriots and was also regarded to have been an oracle. He was described as a tough, educated and ambitious man.

== See also ==
- Pal Dushi
- Pal Gazulli
- Angelo Flavio Comneno
- Skanderbeg
