= Battle of Ohrid =

1464 battle between Albanian-Venetian and Ottoman forces

Coordinates: 41°7′1″N 20°48′6″E

Battle of Ohrid Beteja e Ohrit
- Part of the Albanian–Ottoman Wars (1432–1479)
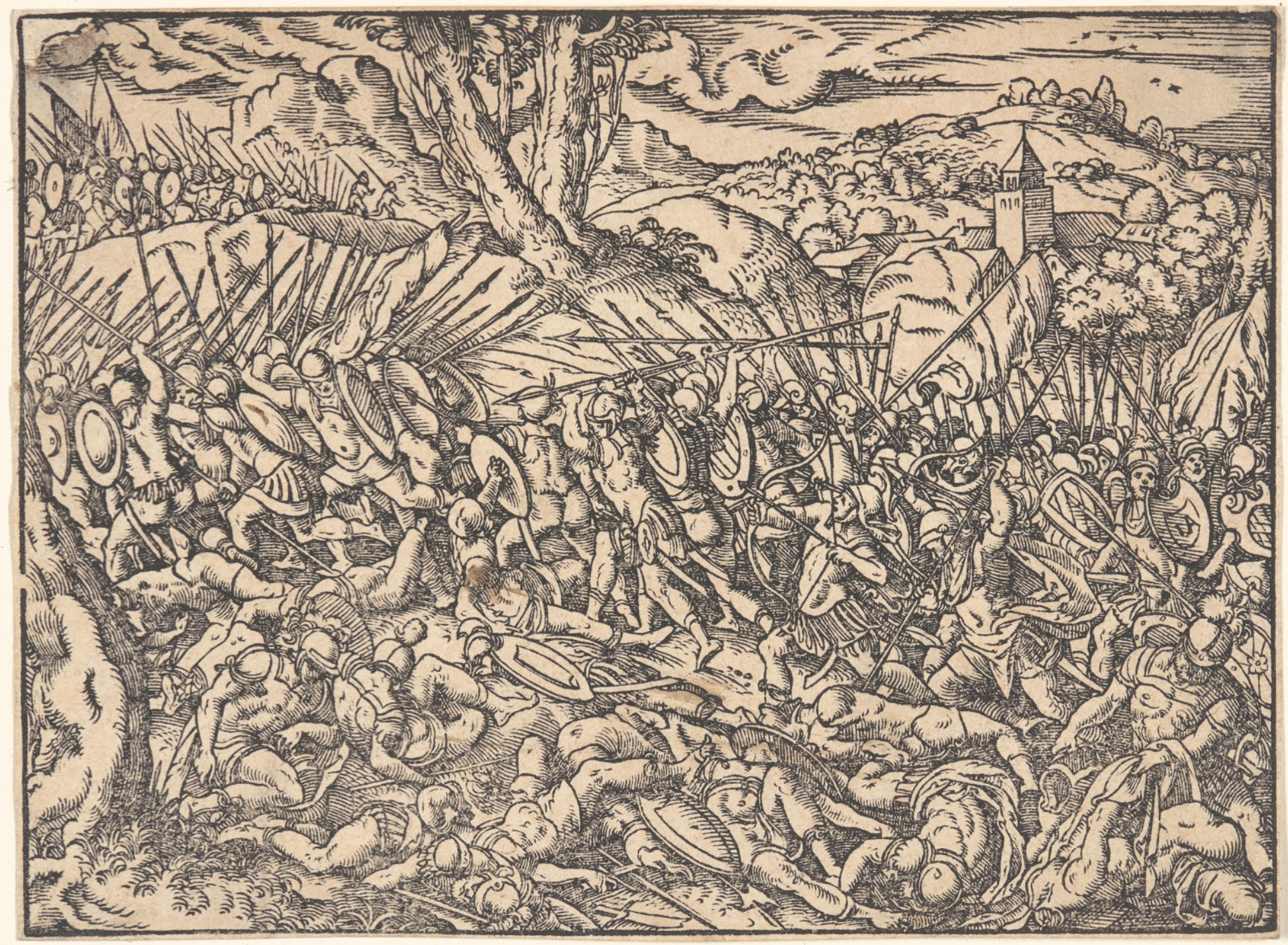
- Woodcut depicting the battle by Jost Amman, 1587
Date	14/15 September 1464
Location	Near Ohrid (present-day North Macedonia)
Result	Albanian–Venetian victory

Belligerents
League of Lezhë; Republic of Venice	Ottoman Empire

Commanders and leaders
Skanderbeg (Republic of Venice) Cimarosto	(Ottoman Empire) Şeremet Bey

Strength
12,000 Albanians; 1,000 Venetians	14,000 cavalry

Casualties and losses
Unknown	10,000

The Battle of Ohrid (Albanian: Beteja e Ohrit) took place on 14 or 15 September 1464 between Albanian ruler Skanderbeg's forces and Ottoman forces. A crusade against Sultan Mehmed II had been planned by Pope Pius II with Skanderbeg as one of its main leaders. The battle near Ohrid occurred as a result of an Albanian incursion into Ottoman territory. The Ottomans stationed in the area were assaulted by Skanderbeg's men and 1,000 Venetian soldiers under Cimarosto. The Ottomans were lured out of their protections in Ohrid and ambushed by the Albanian cavalry. Skanderbeg won the resulting battle and his men earned 40,000 ducats after the captured Ottoman officers were ransomed. Pius II died before the planned crusade began, however, forcing Skanderbeg to fight his battles virtually alone.

== Background ==
Pope Pius II's crusade against the Ottoman Empire was declared in November 1463. Skanderbeg, the leader of the Albanians, was a vital ally to this effort and would have become one of its main leaders. The Venetians, who had also joined the crusade, could not persuade Lekë Dukagjini, Skanderbeg's lukewarm ally in northern Albania, to join until the pope intervened. Furthermore, the major European powers were reluctant to join the pope's crusade. Among those inquired were the city of Florence, Francisco Sforza of Milan, Louis XI of France, and Ferdinand I of Naples, all of whom declined for their own reasons. The Republic of Venice, however, decided to aid Skanderbeg by sending 500 cavalry and 500 infantry under the condottiero Antonio da Cosenza, also known as Cimarosto. Once the campaign season began, Mathias Corvinus of Hungary recaptured many of the Bosnian strongpoints, including Jajce, which had been taken from the Kingdom of Bosnia by the Ottomans. Mehmed II marched into Bosnia, pillaging the countryside, hoping that his enemies would surrender. The Hungarian resistance, however, was stiff. The Ottomans still managed to make headway against the Hungarians who had been trying to lift the Ottoman siege on Jajce with a ruse. The Sultan continued his siege while Mathias escaped from the fortress with a force of men, but the retreating army was harried, with 200 soldiers being captured and sent to Constantinople for execution. Despite the setback, Jajce held out and Mehmed retreated from Bosnia.

== Campaign ==
After Skanderbeg's raid into Macedonia the year before, the Sultan decided to strengthen his fortresses in the area. He then sent Şeremet Bey to Ohrid, a city close to Skanderbeg's domains, with 14,000 cavalry to prevent another Albanian incursion. After learning of this, Skanderbeg prepared to march against Şeremet. The pasha's men, however, were stationed both inside and outside the city, making it difficult to defeat them. Before marching, Skanderbeg received news that Pius had arrived in Ancona and died upon seeing the crusader fleet. He left Cimarosto with an Italian force in Valikardhë (near modern-day Bulqizë in eastern Albania). Skanderbeg then decided to march against Şeremet anyway and set off with 12,000 cavalry three hours after dusk. After one day of marching, Skanderbeg reached Macedonia and began pillaging the land.

=== Battle ===
Once he reached Ohrid, Skanderbeg gave a speech to his men, encouraging them for the coming battle. He then assigned Pekë Emmanuali and Peter Engjëlli, Pal Engjëlli's brother, as commanders of a 500-man troop of cavalry where they were to approach the gates of Ohrid and provoke the Ottomans to attack. They were to throw smoke and dust into the air to irritate the garrison. Then they were to feign retreat where the pursuing Ottoman cavalry would be ambushed by the main Albanian force. On 14 or 15 September, everything went as planned and the trap was sprung. Skanderbeg's assault came out and killed 10,000 Ottoman men and captured twelve Ottoman units, among them Şeremet's son. The Ottoman forces were pursued by the Venetian forces alongside the Albanians. The Albanian-Venetian losses were few.

== Aftermath ==
According to legend, Skanderbeg celebrated the event by dining off letnica (Ohrid trout), a fish found in Lake Ohrid that was sent to the Byzantine emperors every Friday for their supper meal. The twelve captured officers were ransomed for 40,000 ducats. Skanderbeg distributed this amount through his force, with every man receiving his fair share. He then besieged Ohrid for a short time before returning to Albania; the Venetian Senate hailed the campaign as a victory despite not being able to take Ohrid. The crusade seemed to have gone well for the Christian side but, after Pius' death, the remaining cardinals lost their hope and handed the money raised for the crusade to the Venetians. Mehmed saw Skanderbeg's vulnerability and sent Ballaban Badera, an Albanian janissary, to Albania where they met at Vaikal and he was defeated. Ballaban had replaced Şeremet Bey as the commander in Ohrid after the latter fell out of favor with the sultan. Ballaban would meet Skanderbeg several more times in battle before being mortally wounded in action at the second siege of Krujë.
