= Mehmed II's 1467 Albanian campaign =

1467 Ottoman military campaign

Coordinates: 41°31′N 19°48′E

Mehmed II's 1467 Albanian campaign Fushata shqiptare e vitit 1467 e Mehmetit II
- Part of the Albanian–Ottoman Wars (1432–1479) and the Ottoman–Venetian War (1463–1479)
Date	Summer 1467
Location	Albania
Result	Ottoman victory
Territorial changes	The Ottomans captured all Albanian territories (Debar, Pijaç, Muniz, Kulura, Bensh, Budonca, Bastar, Bulçesh, Mudsh, Brus, Shengjin, Fravesh, Selite, Linze, Shupal, Buzurshek Valley) except Durrës, Alessio, Krujë, and Shkodra. The League of Lezhë was left without any fortresses.

Belligerents
League of Lezhë; Republic of Venice	Ottoman Empire

Commanders and leaders
Skanderbeg; Baldassare Perducci	(Ottoman Empire) Mehmed II; (Ottoman Empire) Mahmud Pasha

Strength
1,000 garrisoned in Krujë; 1,000 infantry and 300 horsemen dispatched by Venice	60,000 dispatched to northern Albania; 12,000 dispatched to Durrës

Casualties and losses
10,000 Albanian soldiers were killed in the Battle of Buzurshek; Many civilian casualties and prisoners	Unknown

The 1467 Albanian campaign (Albanian: Fushata shqiptare e vitit 1467) by Mehmed II and the Ottoman Empire took place in the summer of 1467 in Albania. As a result of the campaign, the fortresses and regions of Albania were divided between Venice and the Ottomans. The Albanian resistance forces were destroyed and the rebellion collapsed. The rebel Albanian leaders continued their lives under Venetian rule.

The destruction of Ballaban Pasha's army and the siege of Elbasan during the previous siege of Krujë forced Mehmed II to attack Skanderbeg again in the summer of 1467, only 2 months after the latter's victory in the previous siege. He also sent troops to raid the Venetian possessions (especially Shkodër and Durrës, which was also besieged and bombarded for a short time) and keep them isolated. He then besieged Krujë for a few days, but upon realizing that a direct assault wasn't practical, he decided to retreat.

== Background ==
Mehmed II probably intended to send a fleet against Venice in 1467, targeting regions such as the Morea or Euboea. Consequently, he initiated the construction of new ships to support this endeavour. However, Skanderbeg's successful liberation of Krujë in the second siege, together with the demise of Ballaban Pasha and heavy losses for the Ottomans, marked a notable shift. Mehmed II was forced to abandon his plans for a naval expedition and attack Skanderbeg again.

Subsequent news of Mehmed's renewed march towards Albania caused concern to the Venetians, particularly with the inference that he intended to capture Durrës. The city was of strategic importance to the Ottomans as a base for operations against the Italian coast.

== Campaign ==
During the spring of 1467, Mehmed II embarked on a military campaign into Albania, choosing Berat as the point of entry, located south of the territories under the control of Skanderbeg. In the historical account, Tursun Beg chronicles the initial engagement in the Buzurshek valley near Elbasan, characterized by its rugged terrain flanked by towering mountains. Upon encountering resistance from Albanian forces entrenched in the elevated positions, Anatolian troops advanced from one end of the ravine while Rumelian forces approached from the other. Under cover of night, the Anatolians launched a surprise assault, resulting in the deaths of adult males and the enslavement of women, girls, and boys. Skanderbeg then retreated as the Ottoman Grand Vizier Mahmud Pasha pursued him, managing to escape to the mountains. Mahmud Pasha spent fifteen days in the mountains searching every part, but Skanderbeg had managed to escape to the coast.

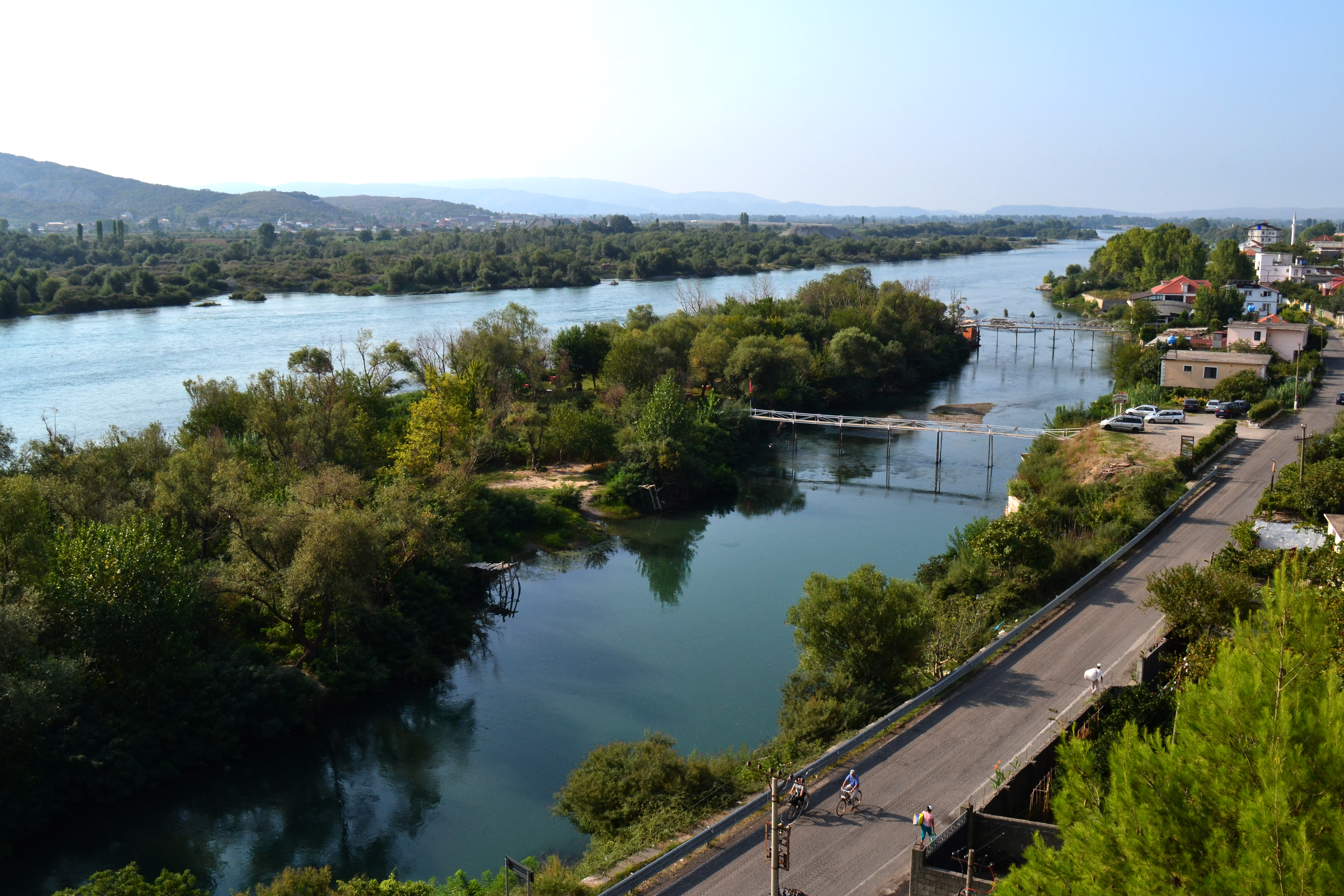
Buna river near Shkodër

Subsequently, the Ottomans proceeded northward along the Mat river, securing strategic natural fortresses in the mountainous terrain. As described by Michael Critobulus, they systematically traversed the region, asserting control over mountains, ravines, gullies, valleys, defiles, and other natural features, indiscriminately subjugating the populace and laying waste to the land for a period of two weeks. From their position along the Mat river, the Sultan dispatched Mahmud Pasha to raid the Venetian stronghold of Shkodër in northern Albania. After pillaging the surrounding area, Mahmud Pasha and his forces traversed the Buna river, launching raids further northward.

On July 8, Skanderbeg penned a letter to the Venetian council from Shkodër, urgently requesting assistance. In response, he was assured that the Venetian authorities had been directed to extend all feasible aid to him. Additionally, a contingent of 1,000 infantry and 300 cavalry was swiftly mobilized and dispatched to the areas under threat.

By this time, reports had surfaced that Mehmed and his vast army had encamped near the Erzen river, five miles north of Durrës. The city, though well supplied, had been abandoned by its inhabitants. Large numbers of refugees arrived in Brindisi to escape Ottoman retaliation. This influx raised concerns about possible disease outbreaks in Apulia. Durrës was nearly deserted, as residents of neighboring villages sought refuge in the mountains. Ottoman troops feigned retreat only to ambush returning peasants and shepherds, subjecting them to slaughter or enslavement. Even bronze church bells were removed and taken to prevent their use in making Ottoman cannons. Disturbing reports reached the West detailing the mass exodus into the mountains and the brutal fate awaiting those captured by the enemy.

The Sultan had deployed a force of 12,000 horsemen to the harbor vicinity. However, according to the reports received by the Signoria, it appears that the attempted assault on Durrës and its surrounding areas was unsuccessful. The Ottoman cavalry encountered staunch resistance from the troops entrenched within the city walls, preventing its capture. Consequently, the horsemen redirected their efforts towards Krujë. However, it appears that the Ottomans withdrew eastward without successfully capturing Krujë. Realizing they couldn't take it by force, Mehmed chose to return and left some of his troops to keep up the blockade and siege.

== Aftermath ==
Through this campaign, Mehmed II established complete control over Albania. Mustafa Öztürk has stated that Albania was conquered in 1468.

Though, according to historian Franz Babinger, the campaign ended in mid-to-late summer without achieving its goals, as the sultan's involvement was hesitant and sporadic. The Albanians breathed a collective sigh of relief, and those who had fled or been displaced gradually returned to their homes. A Venetian report even indicates that by August, Skanderbeg had regained control of all his lost territories.

In the Ottoman cadastral registers (tahrir defterleri) of 1467, there is a register entitled “Sûret-i Defter-i Sancak-i Arnavid.” This register records that the sanjak was administered by Ali Bey and consisted of ten districts. This confirms the accuracy of Ottoman historians’ claims that during the Albanian campaign of 1467, the province of Albania was fully conquered and divided into two sanjaks.

Wherever the Ottoman army advanced, it established control over settlements, villages, and mountainous regions alike. Mehmed II ensured permanent domination in Albania by establishing garrisons in every region he entered.

Moreover, during the campaign, the active Albanian resistance forces were destroyed in the battle fought in the Burshek Valley. The Albanian army, having suffered approximately 10,000 casualties, was left without forces capable of halting the Ottoman armies. After this battle, Skanderbeg retreated into the mountains, with Mahmud Pasha pursuing him.

After bringing the entire rebellious region under control, Mehmed II concluded the campaign. Some of Skanderbeg’s former territories passed into Ottoman hands, while others were left to the Venetians. All remaining Albanian territories came under Ottoman control.

This indicates that the League of Lezhë no longer possessed any fortresses or territory. Albanian lands were divided between the Ottomans and the Venetians. At this time, some Albanian lords entered Ottoman administration, while others came under Venetian rule. With the exception of a narrow strip in the northwest, the entirety of Albania was incorporated into Ottoman territory.

== Sources ==
- Schmitt, Oliver Jens (2009). Skanderbeg: der neue Alexander auf dem Balkan (in German). Regensburg: Verlag Friedrich Pustet. ISBN 978-3-7917-2229-0.
- Stavrides, Theoharis (2001). The Sultan of Vezirs: The Life and Times of the Ottoman Grand Vezir Mahmud Pasha Angelović (1453-1474). Leiden: Brill. ISBN 978-90-04-12106-5.
- Babinger, Franz (1978). Hickman, William C. (ed.). Mehmed the Conqueror and His Time. Translated by Manheim, Ralph. Princeton, New Jersey: Princeton University Press. ISBN 978-0-691-01078-6.
- Imber, Colin (1990). The Ottoman Empire 1300-1481. Istanbul: The Isis Press. ISBN 975-428-015-0.
- Barleti, Marin (2012). Hosaflook, David (ed.). The Siege of Shkodra: Albania's Courageous Stand Against Ottoman Conquest, 1478. Translated by Hosaflook, David. Tirana: Onufri. ISBN 978-99956-87-77-9.
