= Paulus Dussus =

Roman Catholic bishop

Paulus Dussus (fl. 1440–54) was the Roman Catholic archbishop of Krujë (Craynensis archiepiscopis), also having served as (by year mentioned) the bishop of Šas (or Svač, Suacium, Suacensis) in 1440, bishop of Drivast in 1444 and 1454. According to R. Elsie, he was the bishop of Šas in 1443, and notes that it is uncertain if Paulus Dussus (whom he calls "Pal Dushi") and Paulus Angelus were the same person.

== Sources ==
- Archivio di Stato di Venezia; Giuseppe Valentini (1974). Acta Albaniae Veneta saeculorum XIV et XV. Typis Josephi Tosini; [poi] Mediolani, Typis P. I. M. E.
- Parrino, Ignazio (1971). Acta Albaniae Vaticana: res Albaniae saeculorum XIV et XV atque cruciatam spectantia. Biblioteca Apostolica Vaticana.
