= Demetrio Franco =

Albanian historian

- Born: 1443; Drivasto
- Died: 1525 (aged 81–82); Trevi
- Other name: Dhimitër Frëngu
- Occupations: scholar, soldier and Catholic priest
- Years active: 1443–1480 - ...?
- Known for: author of the biography of Skanderbeg
- Notable work: Gli illustri e glorioisi gesti et vittoriose imprese contra Turchi del S. Don Giorgio Castriotto detto Scanderbeg, principe di Epiro, also with the title : Comentario de le cose de' Turchi, et del S. Georgio Scanderbeg, principe d' Epyro

Demetrio Franco (Albanian: Dhimitër Frëngu; 1443–1525) was an Albanian historian. He was a close accomplice of Skanderbeg, later publishing works on his life.

== Life ==
Franco was born in Drivasto in 1443 to a Catholic family. Through his mother he was a cousin of Pal Engjëlli, the Archbishop of Durrës and a close collaborator of Scanderbeg. In 1466 he accompanied Skanderbeg in Rome as a scribe. In 1479 after Shkodër was conquered by the Ottoman Empire he migrated to Italy, where he served as vicar until his death in Trevi in 1525.

== Service and work ==
Franco himself accompanied Skanderbeg to Italy in the winter of 1466–1467. Following his death in 1468, Franco moved to Tivar, and then to Venice. In April 1480, he published a biography of Skanderbeg in Latin at the printing house of German Erhard Ratdolf.

His most notable piece work is considered to be Gli illustri e gloriosi gesti e vittoriose imprese fatte contro i Turchi dal Signor Don Georgio Castriotto detto Scanderbeg, principe d' Epiro, along with the aforementioned biography of Skanderbeg.

== Sources ==
- Demetrio Franco : "Gli illustri et gloriosi gesti et vittoriose imprese cobtra Turchi fatte dal Signor Giorgio Castriotto detto Scanderbeg principe di Epiro, (manuscript, 1480), Italian translation 1584, in Venice.
- Paolo Jovio : "Commentario delle cose de Turchi et del Signor Gorgio Scanderbeg, prencipe d'Epirro., Venice, 1539.
- Jaques De Lavardin, Histoire de Georges Castriote surnommé Scanderbeg Roi d'Albanie, Paris 1576".
- Jean Nicolas Duponcet : "Histoire de Scanderbeg Roy d'Albanie",

Paris 1709.

- R.P. Duponcet : "Les exploits heroïque de Scanderbeg Roi d'Albanie,

Liège, 1854.

- Anonimo di Palermo : "Storia di Giorgio Castriotto sopranomminato Scanderbeg, principe d'Albania, Palermo, 1847.
- C.C. Moore, George Castriot Scanderbeg, King of Albania, 1850.
- Fan Stillian Noli : " Historia e' Sknderbeut§", Tirana, 1924.
- Harry Hodkinson Scanderbeg, London, 1999.
- Lek Pervizi, translator, of Veprat e Lavdishme te Skenderbeut Of Dmetrius Francus, Tirana, 2005
- Lek Pervizi, Scanderbeg, Album commemoratif, Bruxelles, 2018
