= Sanjak of Ohrid =

1395–1864 Ottoman administrative unit in the Balkans

Sanjak of Ohri Sanxhaku i Ohrit Ohri Sancağı Охридски санџак
- Sanjak of the Ottoman Empire
- 1395–1864
- Capital: Manastir, Ohri
- History
  - Established: 1395
  - Establishment of the Monastir Vilayet: 1864
Preceded by	Succeeded by
Lordship of Prilep	Sanjak of Monastir
- Today part of: Albania; North Macedonia

The Sanjak of Ohri (Turkish: Ohri Sancağı, Albanian: Sanxhaku i Ohrit, Bulgarian: Охридски санджак, Macedonian: Охридски санџак) was one of the sanjaks of the Ottoman Empire established in 1395. Part of it was located on the territory of the Lordship of Prilep, a realm in Macedonia ruled by the Ottoman vassal Prince Marko until his death in the Battle of Rovine.

== Administrative division ==
When the Sanjak of Ohrid was established in 1395, it was a part of the Rumelia Eyalet and was one of its earliest established sanjaks. Before it became part of the Ottoman Empire in 1395, its territory belonged to the realm of Prince Marko. At first its county town was Bitola and later it was Ohrid, which is why it has also been referred to in sources as Sanjak of Monastir (or Bitola). This should not be confused with the later Sanjak of Monastir, established in 1826 from the eastern part of the Sanjak of Ohrid, and which entirely replaced the latter in 1864.

The territory of the Sanjak of Ohrid changed over time. Although Halil Inalcik explains that the Sanjak of Elbasan was established as soon as the fortress of Elbasan was constructed in 1466, based on Tursun Beg's records there is a possibility that Elbasan was first part of the Sanjak of Ohrid.

Official Ottoman censuses (Turkish: Tapu tahrir defterleri) were organized in 1467, 1519 (collective census) and 1583 on the territory of the Sanjak of Ohrid.

The census from the beginning of the 16th century registered that the Sanjak of Ohrid had the kazas (districts) of Ohrid, Debar, Akçahisar (Krujë) and Mat, and had 4 towns, 6 fortresses, 849 villages, 32,648 Christian families and 623 Muslim families.

According to the census of 1583, the Sanjak of Ohrid had three kazas with 13 nahiye. After a later expansion, the Sanjak of Ohrid had 22 nahiyahs, 6 in the region of Macedonia and 16 in Albania. There was a substantial presence of ethnic Albanians in this sanjak.

The administrative division of the Rumelia Eyalet was reformed, based on the sultan's hatisherif of 21 June 1836, and the territories of its sanjaks were substantially changed while Sanjak of Ohrid became an arpalik of Valide Sultan. Until 1864, it was part of the Monastir Eyalet, while the kaza of Krujë, among others, was incorporated into the Sanjak of Scutari. As mentioned above, after the establishment of the Monastir Vilayet in 1864, the Sanjak of Ohrid ceased to exist and its territory was incorporated into the Sanjak of Monastir (first established as a sanjak, separate from the Sanjak of Ohrid, in 1826).

== History ==
Dorotheos, the Archbishop of Ohrid and his clerks and boyars were expatriated to Istanbul in 1466 probably because of their anti-Ottoman activities during Skanderbeg's rebellion. In 1467 many Christians from Skopje, Ohrid, Serres and Kastoria were forcibly deported to Elbasan, a new Ottoman fortress in Albania.

Peasants of the Sanjak of Ohrid participated for ten years in the anti-Ottoman 1564 rebellion of the peasants from Mariovo and Prilep. On 25 July 1571 it was proposed to divide Sanjak of Ohrid on two part, in order to increase public security in situation of constant rebellions in this sanjak.

In 1613 Ottoman authorities ordered the destruction of all newly built Christian churches in the villages of the Sanjak of Ohrid.

Evliya Çelebi (1611–1682) dedicated a whole chapter of his work Seyahatname to the Sanjak of Ohrid.

In the autumn of 1794, Kara Mahmud Bushati of the Pashalik of Scutari subjugated the sanjaks of Elbasan and Ohrid.

== Governors ==
- Junayd of Aydın, sanjakbey (fl. 1406).
- Şeremet Bey.
- Ballaban Badera, sanjakbey (t. 1464–1465).
- Ebubekir Pasha (t. July 1792–?), previously Belgrade Vizier.
- Muhtar Pasha (t. 1796–1797), son of Ali Pasha.
- Mustafa Pasha Bushatli (t. 1824–?).
