= Tursun Beg =

Ottoman historian (c. 1420 – 1499)

- Title: Tursun Beg

Personal life
- Born: c. 1420
- Died: 1499
- Era: Ottoman Empire
- Main interest: Ottoman history
- Notable work: "Tarih-i Ebülfeth" ("The History of the Conqueror")

Religious life
- Religion: Islam

Tursun Beg (Turkish: Tursun Bey; probably born in mid-1420s in Edirne) was an Ottoman bureaucrat and historian who wrote a chronicle dedicated to Mehmed II.

Tursun Beg's life is only known from references in his chronicle. He came from a prominent timariot family and held a timar himself. He worked in the imperial divan and accompanied Mehmed II during the siege of Constantinople in 1453 that led to the fall of Constantinople.

Tursun Beg's only known work is the Tarih-i Ebülfeth (تاريخ ابو الفتح in Ottoman; "The History of the Conqueror").

== Bibliography ==
- Tursun Beg. The history of Mehmed the Conqueror. [Tarih-i Ebülfeth] Halil Inalcik and Rhoads Murphey trans. Minneapolis: Bibliotheca Islamica, 1978.
- Woodhead, Christine. "Tursun Beg." Encyclopaedia of Islam. 2nd Edition.

== See also ==
- List of Muslim historians
