= Battle of Vajkal =

1465 conflict between Ottoman and Albanian forces

Coordinates: 41°07′01″N 20°48′06″E

Battle of Vajkal Beteja e Vajkalit
- Part of the Albanian–Ottoman Wars (1432–1479)
Date	April 1465
Location	Vajkal valley, Dibra, Albania
Result	Albanian victory

Belligerents
League of Lezhë	Ottoman Empire

Commanders and leaders
Skanderbeg; Vladan Jurica (POW)	Ballaban Pasha

Strength
4,500–5,500	18,000

Casualties and losses
Unknown; Heavy casualties	Unknown; Heavy casualties

The Battle of Vajkal or Battle of Valkal (Albanian: Beteja e Vajkalit) was fought in April of 1465 between the Albanian forces of Skanderbeg and an Ottoman army under Ballaban Pasha, an Ottoman commander of Albanian origin. Ballaban, the new Ottoman sanjakbey of the Sanjak of Ohrid, was sent by Sultan Mehmed II to attack the Albanian forces. The Albanians were ultimately victorious, but both sides suffered heavy losses. Some of Skanderbeg's officers were captured by the fleeing Ottomans and were then summarily executed.

== Location ==
The Vajkal valley is situated in a region that functions as the passage between Dibra and Mati. Although different scholarly opinions have been formulated on the location of the battle of Vajkal - including possible locations near Dibra and Ohrid - the battle undoubtedly occurred near the modern village of Vajkal in Dibër and the corresponding Fusha e Vajkalit (the Field of Vajkal), which correspond best to the description of Vajkal given by Marin Barleti. The Tower of Skanderbeg was situated in Vajkal, overlooking the valley and the important road passing through it, and a variety of toponyms in the region related to both Vajkal and Skanderbeg are also considered to act as plausible evidence for the region being the site of the battle. The oldest form of the name 'Vajkal' is believed to have been Valkal, stemming from the Latin "vall(is) callis" (valley, road) or a compound of the Albanian words Val (valley) and Kalë (horse), meaning the "Valley of Horses".

== Background ==
Sultan Mehmed II of the Ottoman Empire had given Ballaban Badera, the sanjakbey of the Sanjak of Ohrid, the reins of the Ottoman campaigns in Albania. Ballaban had been a peasant in Skanderbeg's ancestral domains and was raised through the devsirme system to become a Janissary for the Sultan, much like Skanderbeg.

Ballaban, conscious of the possibility of defeat, presented Skanderbeg with a series of gifts in the hopes that if the Ottoman commander was captured, the Albanian chieftain would mercifully spare him. Ballaban had known Skanderbeg when they were both in the Ottoman court, but he had always held great animosity towards Skanderbeg. Ballaban tried to come off as Skanderbeg's personal friend and ally, but he was always ready to move against him. Once he had learned that Skanderbeg had been camped in Vajkal with his men, Ballaban began his campaign against Skanderbeg.

== Prelude ==
According to Marin Barleti, Skanderbeg's camp was situated in the open valley of Vajkal, whilst the Ottomans had set up camp on the other side of the valley near a mountain which marked the end of the Vajkal valley.

Skanderbeg had been expecting an Ottoman assault and ensured that his troops were constantly prepared. The day before the battle, he formulated his plan of action; he aimed to trick the Ottomans into thinking that his forces were too weak and too frightened to fight. When the Ottomans were finally lured into the valley under a false sense of security, the Albanian warriors would attack them. The Ottoman forces would then be pursued all the way up to the hills and the Albanians would stop there to avoid a counterattack.

== Battle ==
The next day Ballaban came past the hills but unexpectedly charged at Skanderbeg's forces. Skanderbeg allowed them to approach before launching his own counterattack. A bloody battle followed, resulting in heavy casualties on both sides. Nonetheless, Skanderbeg and the Albanians held their ground and were victorious despite their losses as the Ottomans soon began to flee. Skanderbeg's plan had worked well and most of Skanderbeg's forces had halted after pursuing the Ottomans up to the hills. However, some of the Albanian officers failed to follow Skanderbeg's orders and continued to pursue the Ottomans, who eventually regrouped and ambushed these officers and their men. After being ambushed by the fleeing Ottomans, the Albanian officers fled to the top of a hill where they encountered Ottoman infantrymen. The Albanians mistakenly believed the infantrymen to be Christians and were subsequently captured and sent to Ballaban Badera.

== Aftermath ==
After the Ottomans regrouped with their newly-acquired captives, Ballaban ordered his men to march back to Constantinople with the prisoners. Among the Albanians captured by Ottoman soldiers after the battle were distinguished leaders such as Moisi Golemi, Vladan Gjurica (a relative of Skanderbeg), Muzakë Arianiti (a nephew of Skanderbeg), Gjin Muzaka, Gjon Përlati, Nikollë Berisha, Gjergj Kuka and Gjin Maneshi. Skanderbeg sent an ambassador to the Sultan begging him to return his officers unharmed or else he would execute his own prisoners of war. The Sultan was not moved and refused to free them after being informed of their importance by Ballaban Badera. The Sultan ordered a fifteen-day torture and execution of the Albanian officers in which they were skinned alive one by one. After their deaths, their bodies were thrown to the dogs.

Mehmed ordered Ballaban to continue his campaigns against Albania. Ballaban invaded Albania again, only to be soundly defeated. In the Second Battle of Vajkal in August of 1465, an Ottoman army of 24,000 men under Ballaban Pasha were utterly defeated by an Albanian army of 12,000 men under Skanderbeg.
