= Ballaban Badera =

15th-century Ottoman military officer

- Born: Badera, Mat, Ottoman Empire
- Died: April 1467; Krujë, Principality of Kastrioti
- Military career
- Allegiance: Ottoman Empire
- Branch: Ottoman Army
- Rank: Pasha
- Commands: Sanjakbey of the Sanjak of Ohrid
- Conflicts: Battle of Vajkal; Siege of Krujë (1466–1467) †

Ballaban Badera (also known as Ballaban Pasha or Ballaban Badheri) was an Ottoman military officer. A conscript of the Devshirme child soldier system, he became a Pasha. Ballaban Badera was said to be the first one who climbed the walls of Constantinople during its siege. He held the position of sanjakbey of the Sanjak of Ohrid in 1464 and 1465.

== Biography ==
=== Early life ===
Ballaban Badera was born in Badera, a village in the Mat area, Albania as a Catholic with the name Michael, the son of Mark and Helena. Conscripted through the Devshirme system, he rose to the rank of Pasha in the Ottoman Army under Sultan Mehmed II.

Ballaban's father, Mark, had served in the army of the Wallachian Prince Mircea I, fighting against the Ottoman Turks. Michael was kidnapped during the Ottoman Turkish raids and renamed Ballaban. His mother, Helena, was killed during the Turkish raids. Mark, his father, and Constantine, his brother, escaped and survived the raids. Michael was raised as a Janissary and named Ballaban Badera, or Ballaban Pasha; he was a product of the Devshirme system, as all Janissaries were. Ballaban was one of the best generals of the Ottoman Army under Sultan Mehmed II. Gjergj Kastrioti (Skanderbeg), whom Ballaban Badera would encounter in battlefields frequently, was raised as a Janissary as well, under the same Devshirme system as Ballaban.

=== Ballaban and Skanderbeg ===
Ballaban fought Skanderbeg in April 1465 in the battle of Vajkal. The Albanians were victorious, but Ballaban captured thirteen of their high-ranking generals, among them Moisi Golemi, Skanderbeg's second-in-command and the organizer of his desertion from the Ottoman Court and subsequent return to Albania, along with two of Skanderbeg's nephews.

== Ballaban's campaign (1465) ==
=== Ballaban's brother Constantine ===
Ballaban received further help from the Sultan and was sent leading Ottoman Armies against Skanderbeg once more, alongside an Albanian Pasha called Jakub Bej Arnauti, this time near Upper Dibra, in the Valley of Vaikal, but Ballaban, Jakub Bej Arnauti, and Ottoman Armies were again defeated. Jakub Bej Arnauti perished in that battle.

During all these historical endeavors, Constantine, the son of Mark and Helena, and the brother of the boy Michael who had become Ballaban Badera, was a soldier under the command of Gjergj Kastrioti fighting against the Ottoman Armies led by his brother. Mark, the father of the kidnapped boy Michael, was also a soldier under Gjergj Kastrioti's command. Mark identified with Skanderbeg's cause and he became sworn brothers ("vllam", a widespread practice among Albanians at the time) with Muzak Stresi, the Lord of Shkodër. Mark would go ahead and foster Morsinia, the Albanian Heiress of Muzak's realm, daughter of Muzak Stresi and Mara Cernoviche who were murdered by Hamza Kastrioti, the infamous nephew of Gjergj Kastrioti (Skanderbeg).

Hamëz Kastrioti had appropriated the vast estates of the Stresi and had birth claims over the estates of the Kastrioti's; Ballaban Badera saw the opportunity and organized the coronation of Hamëz Kastrioti as King of Albania, under the vassalage of the Ottomans. Gjergj Kastrioti (Skanderbeg) learned of the plans and gave the order that this must be stopped at any cost and all of Albania must take up arms. The Battle of Albulena ensued and Hamëz Kastrioti was captured.

Ballban Badera later returned to Albania as a commanding general of the army under Mehmet II during the Second Siege of Krujë (1466), where he kept the city besieged for just under a year. In that battle, Ballaban Badera was killed by an arquebus shot to the neck by Gjergj Aleksi, a defender of the city and a hunter in his civilian life. After Ballaban's death, the Ottoman Army stationed in Albania lost its unity and was soon defeated.
