= Skanderbeg =

Albanian warlord and military commander (1405–1468)

- Lord of Albania; Latin: Dominus Albaniae
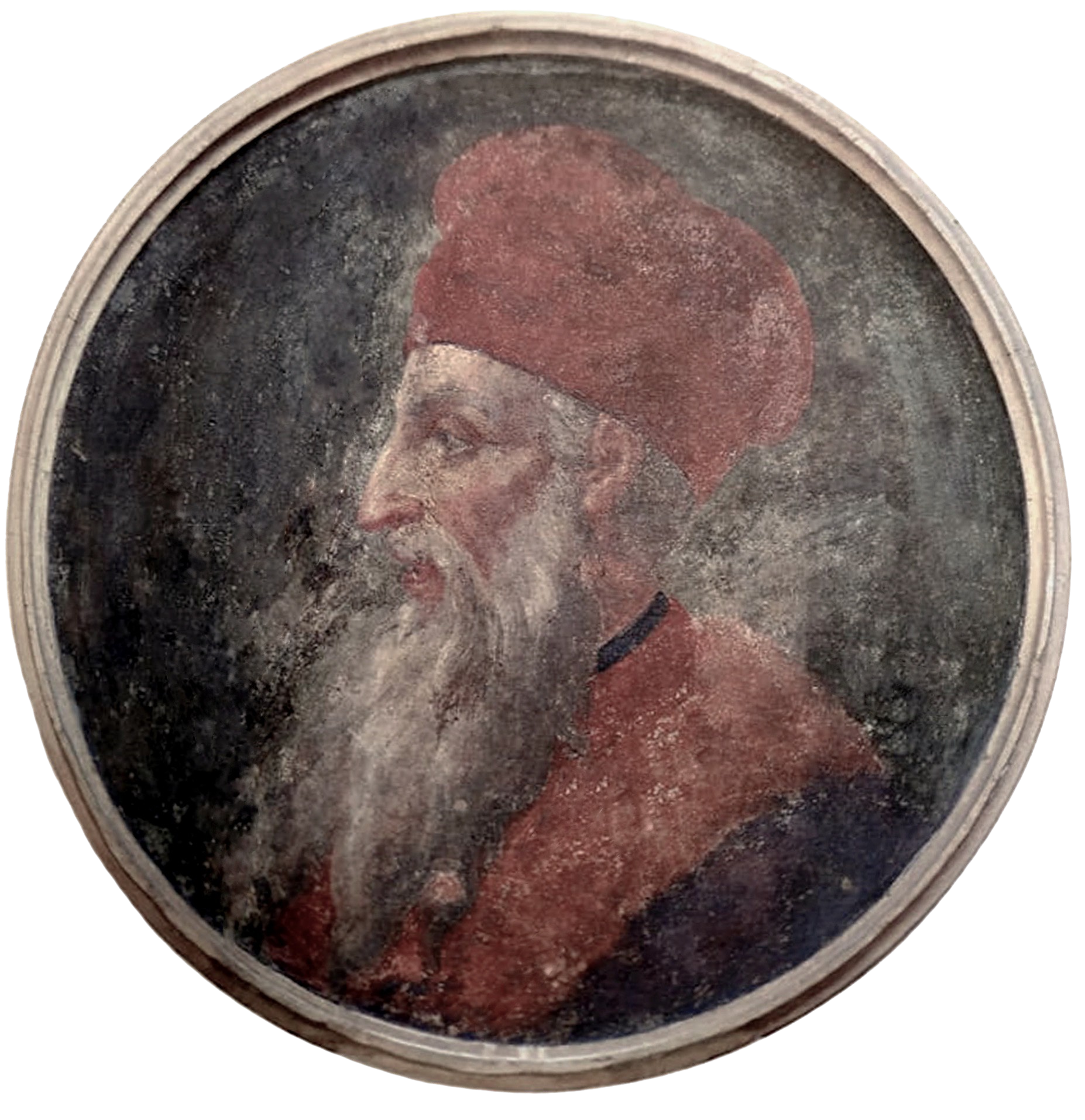
- Portrait of Skanderbeg from 1466 in Palazzo Skanderbeg, Rome, Italy

Lord of Albania
- Reign: 2 March 1444 – 17 January 1468
- Coronation: 2 March 1444 (legacy by Gjergj Arianiti)
- Successor: Lekë III Dukagjini

Prince of Kastrioti
- Reign: 28 November 1443 – 17 January 1468
- Predecessor: Gjon Kastrioti
- Successor: Gjon Kastrioti II
- Born: Gjergj Kastrioti (see Name) c. 1405 possibly Sinë, Principality of Kastrioti
- Died: 17 January 1468 (aged 62); Alessio, Venetian Albania
- Burial: St. Nicholas church, Lezhë
- Spouse: Andronika Arianiti (m. 1451)
- Issue: Gjon Kastrioti II
- House: Kastrioti
- Father: Gjon Kastrioti
- Mother: Voisava Kastrioti
- Religion: Eastern Orthodox Christianity (1405–1423); Islam (1423–1443); Catholicism (1443–1468)
- Occupation: Lord of the Principality of Kastrioti, Chief military commander of League of Lezhë
- Military career
- Allegiance: League of Lezhë
- Conflicts: Expand list: Battle of Albulena; Battle of Torvioll; Battle of Vajkal; Battle of Oranik (1456); Battle of Mokra (1445); Battle of Otonetë; Siege of Svetigrad; Battle of Oranik (1448); Battle of Polog; Battle of Modrič; Second Battle of Mokra (1462); Battle of Ohrid; Battle of Meçad (1465); Siege of Berat (1455); Siege of Krujë (1450); Siege of Krujë (1466–1467)

Gjergj Kastrioti (also known as Skanderbeg; c. 1405 – 17 January 1468) was an Albanian nobleman and military leader who led the League of Lezhë in the Ottoman-Albanian Wars until his death. Skanderbeg is considered to be a major figure of medieval Albanian history and today is the national hero of Albania.

A member of the noble Kastrioti family, Skanderbeg was sent as a hostage to the Ottoman court. He graduated from the Enderun School and entered the service of the Ottoman sultan Murad II (r. 1421–1451) for the next twenty years. His rise through the ranks culminated in his appointment as sanjakbey of the Sanjak of Dibra in 1440. During the Battle of Nish in 1443, he deserted the Ottomans and became the ruler of Krujë and nearby areas extending from Petrelë to Modrič. In March 1444, he established the League of Lezhë, with support from local noblemen, and unified the Albanian principalities.

In 1451, through the Treaty of Gaeta, Skanderbeg recognized de jure the sovereignty of the Kingdom of Naples over Albania, ensuring a protective alliance, although he remained a de facto independent ruler. In 1460–61, he supported Ferdinand I of Naples (r. 1458–1494) in his wars and led an Italian expedition against John II of Anjou (r. 1453–1470). In 1463, he was earmarked to be the chief commander of the crusading forces of Pope Pius II, but the Pope died while the armies were still gathering and the greater European crusade never took place. Together with Venetians, he fought against the Ottomans during the First Ottoman–Venetian War (1463–1479) until his death.

Skanderbeg ranks high in the military history of that time as the most persistent—and ever-victorious—opponent of the Ottoman Empire during its heyday. The central folk hero of the Albanians, Skanderbeg became a central figure in the Albanian National Awakening of the 19th century. He is honored in modern Albania and is commemorated with many monuments and cultural works. Skanderbeg's military skills presented a major obstacle to Ottoman expansion, and many in Western Europe considered him to be a model of Christian resistance against the Ottomans.

== Name ==
The Kastrioti, in comparison to other Albanian noble families, so far remain absent from historical or archival records until their first historical appearance at the end of the 14th century. The historical figure of Konstantin Kastrioti Mazreku is attested in Giovanni Andrea Angelo Flavio Comneno's Genealogia diversarum principum familiarum. Angelo mentions Kastrioti as Constantinus Castriotus, cognomento Meserechus, Aemathiae & Castoriae Princeps (Constantinus Castriotus, surnamed Meserechus, Prince of Aemathia and Castoria). The toponym Castoria has been interpreted as Kastriot, Kastrat in Has, Kastrat in Dibra or the microtoponym "Kostur" near the village of Mazrek in the Has region. In connection to the Kastrioti family name, it is very likely that the name of one of the different Kastriot or Kastrat which were fortified settlements as their etymology shows (castrum) was their family name. The Kastrioti may have originated from this village or probably had acquired it as pronoia. Angelo used the cognomen Meserechus in reference to Skanderbeg and this link to the same name is produced in other sources and reproduced in later ones like Du Cange's Historia Byzantina (1680). These links highlight that the Kastrioti used Mazreku as a name that highlighted their tribal affiliation (farefisni). The name Mazrek(u), which means horse breeder in Albanian, is found throughout all Albanian regions.

Skanderbeg's first name was Gjergj (George) in Albanian. Frang Bardhi in Dictionarium latino-epiroticum (1635) provides two first names in Albanian: Gjeç (Giec) and Gjergj (Gierg). In his personal correspondence in Italian and in most biographies produced after his death in Italy, his name was written as Giorgio. His name on his official seal and signature was Georgius Castriotus Scanderbego (Latin). His correspondence with Slavic states (Republic of Ragusa), was written by scribes like Ninac Vukosalić. Skanderbeg's name in Slavic is recorded the first time in the 1426 act of sale of St. George's tower to his father Gjon Kastrioti in Hilandar as Геѡрг and appears as Гюрьгь Кастриѡть in his later correspondence in the 1450s.

The Ottoman Turks gave him the name اسکندر بگ (İskender bey or İskender beğ), meaning "Lord Alexander", or "Leader Alexander". Skënderbeu and Skënderbej are the Albanian versions, with Skander being the Albanian form of "Alexander". Latinized in Barleti's version as Scanderbegi and translated into English as Skanderbeg or Scanderbeg, the combined appellative is assumed to have been a comparison of Skanderbeg's military skill to that of Alexander the Great. This name was itself used by Skanderbeg even after his re-conversion to Christianity and was later held by his descendants in Italy who became known as the Castriota-Scanderbeg. Skanderbeg always signed himself in Latin: Dominus Albaniae ("Lord of Albania"), and claimed no other titles but that in surviving documents.

== Early life ==
The exact birthplace of Skanderbeg remains a subject of historical debate. One of the main Skanderbeg biographers, Frashëri, has, among others, interpreted Gjon Muzaka's book of genealogies, sources of Raffaele Maffei ("il Volterrano"; 1451–1522), and the Ottoman defter (census) of 1467, and placed the birth of Skanderbeg in the small village of Sinë, one of the two villages owned by his grandfather Pal Kastrioti. Fan Noli's placement of the year of his birth in 1405 is now largely agreed upon, after earlier disagreements, and lack of birth documents for him and his siblings.

His father Gjon Kastrioti held territory between Lezhë and Prizren that included Mat, Mirditë and Dibër in north-central Albania. His mother was Voisava, whose origin is disputed. One view holds that she was a Slavic princess from the Polog region, which has been interpreted as her being a possible member of the Serbian Branković family or a local Bulgarian noble family, although there are no primary or archival sources linking Voisava to the Branković family. The other view is that she was a member of the Albanian Muzaka family, daughter of Domenico Moncino Musachi a relative of the Muzaka house. Voisava was mentioned in a work in 1551 by Andrea Angelo Comneno, where he stated: "From the house of Muzaka descends Voisava, the wife of Gjon Kastrioti, Lord of Krujë and Count of Emathia (Mat)."

Skanderbeg had three older brothers: Stanisha, Reposh and Constantine, and five sisters: Mara, Jelena, Angelina, Vlajka and Mamica.

According to the geopolitical contexts of the time, Gjon Kastrioti changed allegiances and religions when allied to Venice as a Catholic and Serbia as an Orthodox Christian. Gjon Kastrioti later became a vassal of the Sultan since the end of the 14th century, and, as a consequence, paid tribute and provided military services to the Ottomans (such as in the Battle of Ankara in 1402). In 1409, he sent his eldest son, Stanisha, to be the Sultan's hostage.

According to Marin Barleti, a primary source, Skanderbeg and his three older brothers, Reposh, Kostandin, and Stanisha, were taken by the Sultan to his court as hostages; however, according to documents, besides Skanderbeg, only one of the brothers of Skanderbeg, probably Stanisha, was taken hostage and had been conscripted into the Devşirme system, a military institute that enrolled Christian boys, converted them to Islam, and trained them to become military officers. 21st-century historians are of the opinion that while Stanisha might have been conscripted at a young age, and had to go through the Devşirme, this was not the case with Skanderbeg, who is assumed to have been sent hostage to the Sultan by his father only at the age of 18.

It was customary at the time that a local chieftain, who had been defeated by the Sultan, would send one of his children to the Sultan's court, where the child would be a hostage for an unspecified time; this way, the Sultan was able to exercise control in the area ruled by the hostage's father. Far from being held in a prison, the hostages were usually sent to the best military schools and trained to become future military leaders.

== Ottoman service: 1423 to 1443 ==
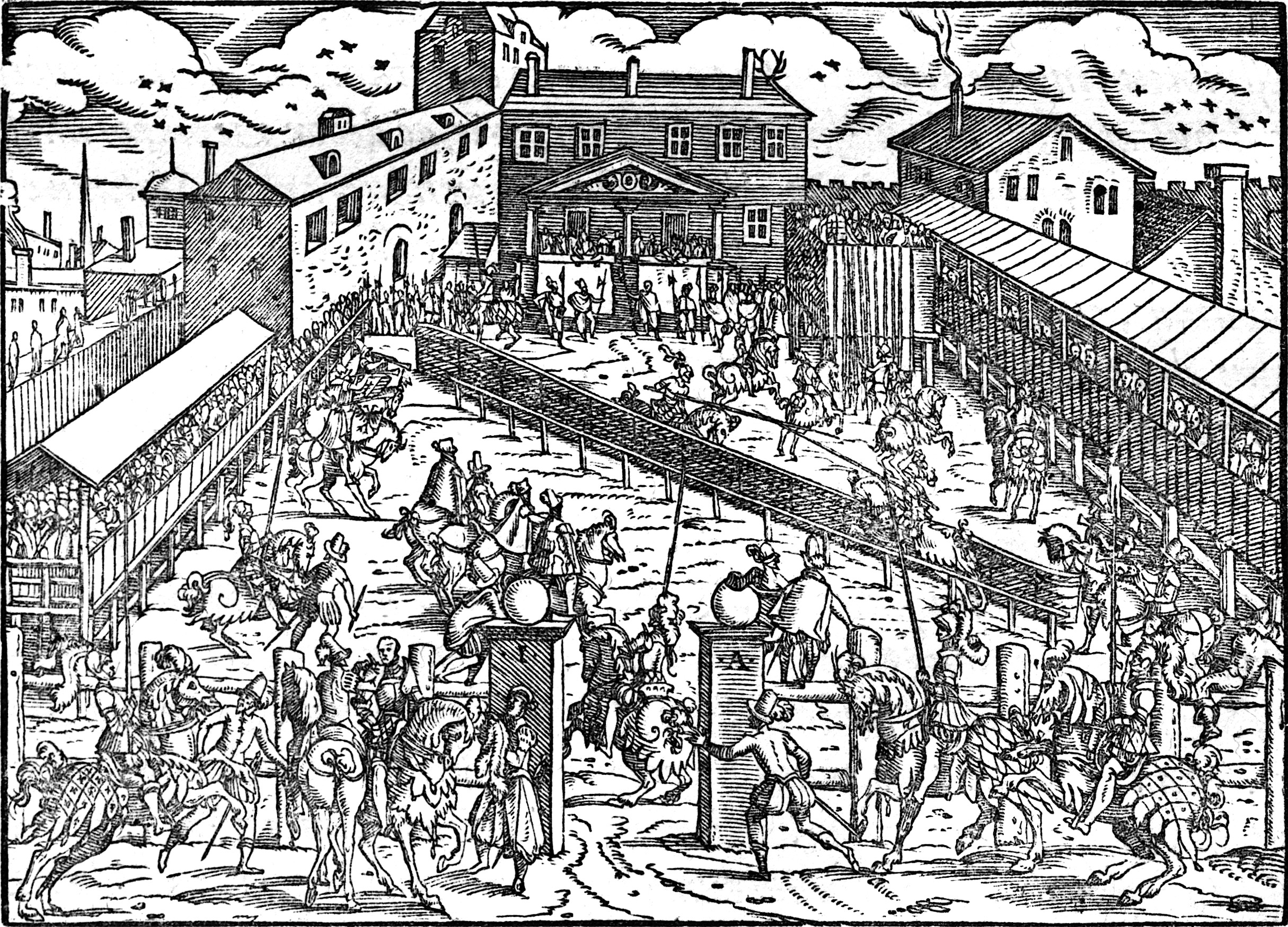
Skanderbeg and other students receiving military education in the Enderun School

Skanderbeg was sent as a hostage to the Ottoman court in Adrianople (Edirne) in 1415, and again in 1423. It is assumed that he remained at Murad II's court as iç oğlan for a maximum of three years, where he received military training at Enderun School.

The earliest existing record of George's name is the First Act of Hilandar from 1426, when Gjon (John) Kastrioti and his four sons donated the right to the proceeds from taxes collected from two villages in Macedonia (in modern Mavrovo and Rostuša, North Macedonia) to the Serbian monastery of Hilandar. Afterwards, between 1426 and 1431, Gjon Kastrioti and his sons, with the exception of Stanisha, purchased four adelphates (rights to reside on monastic territory and receive subsidies from monastic resources) to the Saint George tower and to some property within the monastery as stated in the Second Act of Hilandar. The area which the Kastrioti family had donated was referred to by the monks in Hilandar as the Arbanashki pirg or Albanian tower. Reposh Kastrioti is listed as dux illyricus or Duke of Illyria in Hilandar.

After Skanderbeg graduated from Enderun, the sultan granted him control over one timar (land grant) which was near the territories controlled by his father. His father was concerned that the sultan might order Skanderbeg to occupy his territory and informed Venice about this in April 1428. In the same year Gjon had to seek forgiveness from the Venetian Senate because Skanderbeg participated in Ottoman military campaigns against Christians. In 1430, Gjon was defeated in battle by the Ottoman governor of Skopje, Ishak Bey, and as a result, his territorial possessions were extremely reduced. Later that year, Skanderbeg continued fighting for Murad II in his expeditions, and gained the title of sipahi. Several scholars have assumed that Skanderbeg was given a fiefdom in Nikopol in northern Bulgaria, because a certain "Iskander bey" is mentioned in a 1430 document holding fiefs there. Although Skanderbeg was summoned home by his relatives when Gjergj Arianiti and Andrew Thopia along with other chiefs from the region between Vlorë and Shkodër organized the Albanian revolt of 1432–1436, he did nothing, remaining loyal to the sultan.

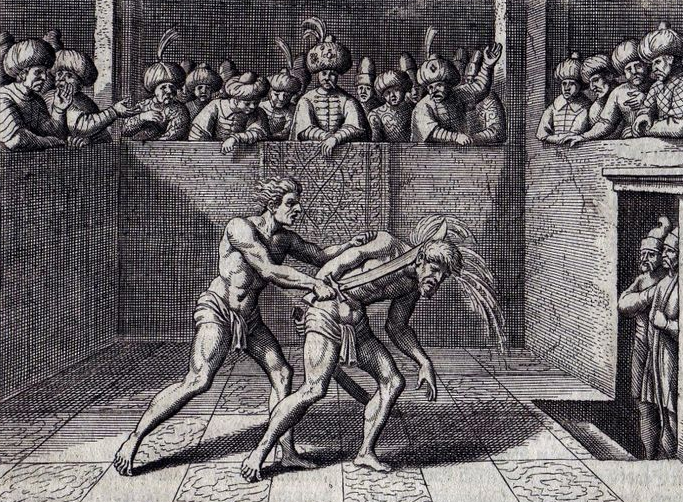
Skanderbeg dueling a Tatar at the Ottoman court, some time before 1439

In 1437–38, he became a subaşı (governor) of the Krujë subaşılık before Hizir Bey was again appointed to that position in November 1438. Until May 1438, Skanderbeg controlled a relatively large timar (of the vilayet of Dhimitër Jonima) composed of nine villages which previously belonged to his father (registered as "Giovanni's land", Turkish: Yuvan-ili). According to İnalcık, at that time Skanderbeg was referred to in Ottoman documents as Juvan oglu Iskender bey. It was because of Skanderbeg's display of military merit in several Ottoman campaigns, that Murad II (r. 1421–51) had given him the title of vali. At that time, Skanderbeg was leading a cavalry unit of 5,000 men.

After his brother Reposh's death on 25 July 1431 and the later deaths of Kostandin and Skanderbeg's father (who died in 1437), Skanderbeg and his surviving brother Stanisha maintained the relations that their father had with the Republic of Ragusa and the Republic of Venice; in 1438 and 1439, they sustained their father's privileges with those states.

During the 1438–43 period, he is thought to have been fighting alongside the Ottomans in their European campaigns, mostly against the Christian forces led by Janos Hunyadi. In 1440 Skanderbeg was appointed sanjakbey of Dibra.

During his stay in Albania as Ottoman governor, he maintained close relations with the population in his father's former properties and also with other Albanian noble families.

== History ==
=== Rise ===
Beside Barleti, other sources on this period are the Byzantine historians Chalcocondylas, Sphrantzes and Critoboulos, and the Venetian documents, published by Ljubić in "Monumenta spectantia historiam Slavorum Meridionalium". The Turkish sources – the chroniclers of the early period (Aşıkpaşazade and the "Tarih-i Al-ı Osman"), and the latter historians (Müneccim Başı) are not at all explicit, and regarding the dates, do not agree with the Western sources. The Turkish chronicles of Neshri, Idris Bitlisi, Ibn Kemal and Sadeddin only mention the first revolt of the "treacherous Iskander" in 846 H. (1442–43), the campaign of Sultan Murad in 851 H. (1447–48) and the last campaign of Mehmed II in 871 H. (1466–67).

In early November 1443, Skanderbeg deserted the forces of Sultan Murad II during the Battle of Niš, while fighting against the crusaders of John Hunyadi. According to some earlier sources, Skanderbeg deserted the Ottoman army during the Battle of Kunovica on 2 January 1444. Skanderbeg quit the field along with 300 other Albanians serving in the Ottoman army. He immediately led his men to Krujë, where he arrived on 28 November, and by the use of a forged letter from Sultan Murad to the Governor of Krujë he became lord of the city that very day. To reinforce his intention of gaining control of the former domains of Zeta, Skanderbeg proclaimed himself the heir of the Balšić family. After capturing some less important surrounding castles (Petrela, Prezë, Guri i Bardhë, Sfetigrad, Modrič, and others) he raised, according to Frashëri, a red standard with a black double-headed eagle on Krujë (Albania uses a similar flag as its national symbol to this day). Despite his military valor, he was only able to hold his own possessions within the very narrow area in today's northern Albania where almost all of his victories against the Ottomans took place.

Skanderbeg abandoned Islam, reverted to Christianity, and ordered others who had embraced Islam or were Muslim settlers to convert to Christianity or face death. From that time on, the Ottomans referred to Skanderbeg as "hain (treacherous) İskender". The small court of Skanderbeg consisted of persons of various ethnicities. Ninac Vukosalić, who was probably a South Slav, was one such member of his court and managed Skanderbeg's bank account in Ragusa, among other things. Members of the Gazulli family had important roles in diplomacy, finance, and the purchase of arms. John Gazulli, a doctor, was sent to the court of king Matthias Corvinus to coordinate the offensive against Mehmed II. The knight Pal Gazulli was travelling frequently to Italy, and another Gazulli, Andrea, was ambassador of the despot of Morea in Ragusa before becoming a member of Skanderbeg's court in 1462. Some adventurers also followed Skanderbeg, such as a man named John Newport; Stefan Maramonte, who acted as Skanderbeg's ambassador to Milan in 1456; Stjepan Radojevic, who in 1466 provided ships for a trip to Split; Ruscus from Cattaro; and others. The Ragusan Gondola/Gundulić merchant family had a role similar to Gazulli. Correspondence was written in Slavic, Greek, Latin, and Italian. Documents in Latin were written by notaries from Italy or Venetian territories in Albania.

This widely adopted variant of the coat of arms of Skanderbeg is based on an illustration found in the 1904 book Gli Albanesi e la Questione Balkanica by prominent Arberësh author and linguist Giuseppe Schirò.

In Albania, the rebellion against the Ottomans had already been smouldering for years before Skanderbeg deserted the Ottoman army. In August 1443, Gjergj Arianiti again revolted against the Ottomans in the region of central Albania. Under Venetian patronage, on 2 March 1444, Skanderbeg summoned Albanian noblemen in the Venetian-controlled town of Lezhë and they established a military alliance known in historiography as the League of Lezhë. Among those who joined the military alliance were the powerful Albanian noble families of Arianiti, Dukagjini, Muzaka, Zaharia, Thopia, Zenevisi, Dushmani and Spani, and also the Serbian nobleman Stefan Crnojević of Zeta. This was the first time that much of Albania was united under a single leader.

For 25 years, from 1443 to 1468, Skanderbeg's 10,000-man army marched through Ottoman territory, winning against consistently larger and better-supplied Ottoman forces. Skanderbeg organized a mobile defense army that forced the Ottomans to disperse their troops, leaving them vulnerable to the hit-and-run tactics of the Albanians. Skanderbeg fought a guerrilla war against the opposing armies by using the mountainous terrain to his advantage. During the first 8–10 years, Skanderbeg commanded an army of generally 10,000–15,000 soldiers, but only had absolute control over the men from his own dominions, and had to convince the other princes to follow his policies and tactics. Skanderbeg occasionally had to pay tribute to the Ottomans, but only in exceptional circumstances, such as during the war with the Venetians or his travel to Italy and perhaps when he was under pressure from Ottoman forces that were too strong.

In the summer of 1444, in the Plain of Torvioll, the united Albanian armies under Skanderbeg faced the Ottomans who were under the direct command of the Ottoman general Ali Pasha, with an army of 25,000 men. Skanderbeg had under his command 7,000 infantry and 8,000 cavalry. 3,000 cavalry were hidden behind enemy lines in a nearby forest under the command of Hamza Kastrioti. At a given signal, they descended, encircled the Ottomans, and gave Skanderbeg a much needed victory. About 8,000 Ottomans were killed and 2,000 were captured. Skanderbeg's first victory echoed across Europe because this was one of the few times that an Ottoman army was defeated in a pitched battle on European soil.

On 10 October 1445, an Ottoman force of 9,000–15,000 men under Firuz Pasha was sent to prevent Skanderbeg from moving into Macedonia. Firuz had heard that the Albanian army had disbanded for the time being, so he planned to move quickly around the Black Drin valley and through Prizren. These movements were picked up by Skanderbeg's scouts, who moved to meet Firuz. The Ottomans were lured into the Mokra valley, and Skanderbeg with a force of 3,500 attacked and defeated the Ottomans. Firuz was killed along with 1,500 of his men. Skanderbeg defeated the Ottomans two more times the following year, once when Ottoman forces from Ohrid suffered severe losses, and again in the Battle of Otonetë on 27 September 1446.

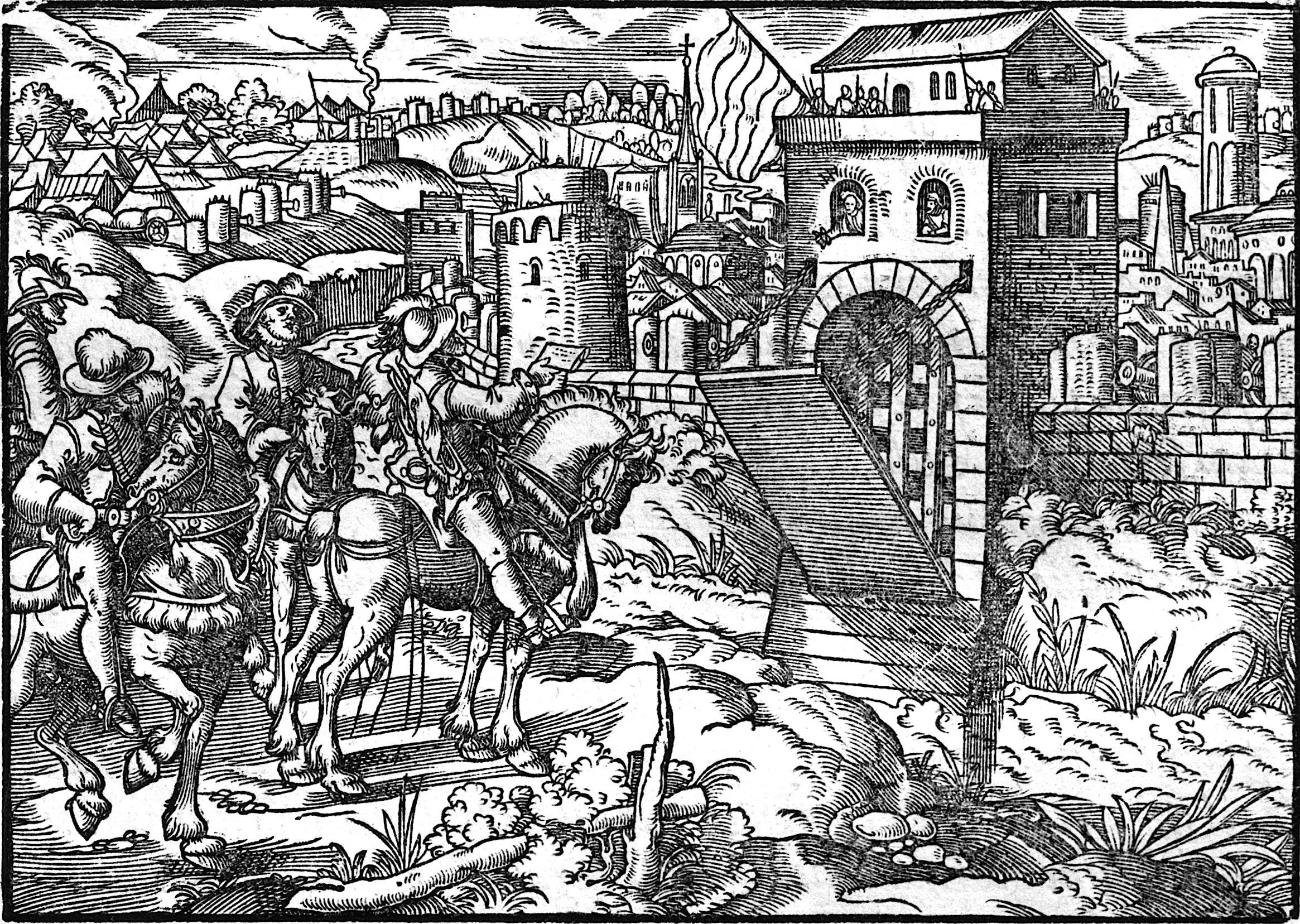
Skanderbeg's return to Krujë, 1444 (woodcut by Jost Amman)

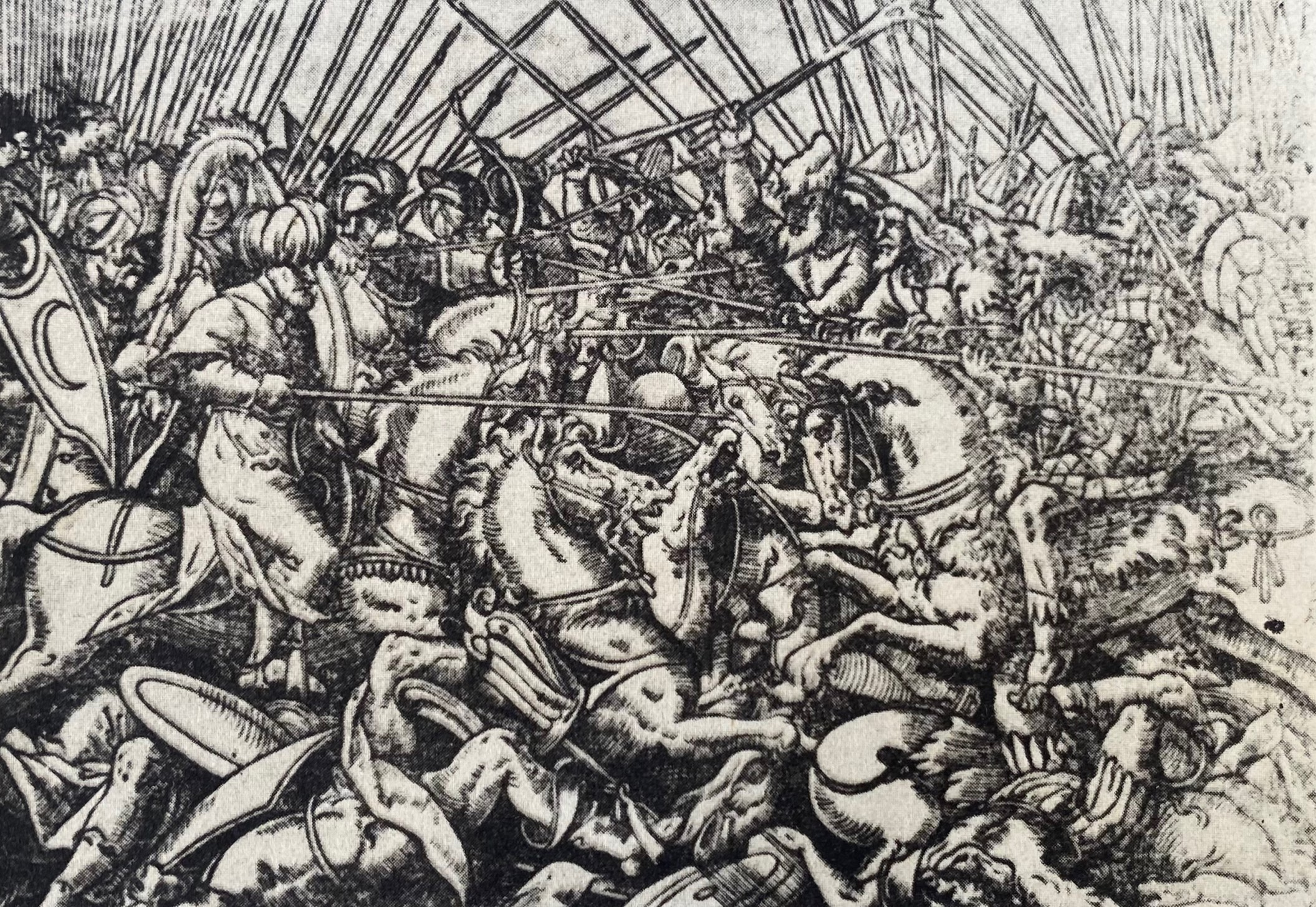
A woodcut of the battle of Varna in 1444

=== War with Venice: 1447 to 1448 ===
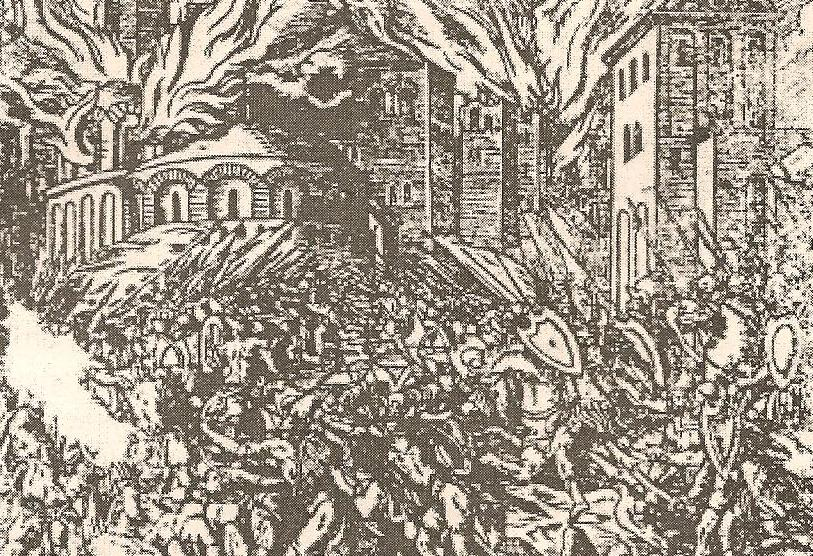
Woodcut depicting an engagement between Albanian and Ottoman forces

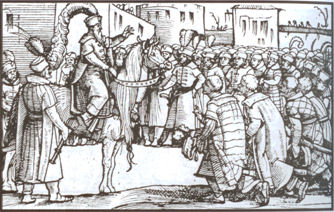
Skanderbeg addressing the people, 16th-century engraving by Jost Amman

At the beginning of the Albanian insurrection, the Republic of Venice was supportive of Skanderbeg, considering his forces to be a buffer between them and the Ottoman Empire. Lezhë, where the eponymous league was established, was Venetian territory, and the assembly met with the approval of Venice. The later affirmation of Skanderbeg and his rise as a strong force on their borders, however, was seen as a menace to the interests of the Republic, leading to a worsening of relations and the dispute over the fortress of Dagnum which triggered the Albanian-Venetian War of 1447–48. After various attacks against Bar and Ulcinj, along with Đurađ Branković and Stefan Crnojević, and Albanians of the area, the Venetians offered rewards for his assassination. The Venetians sought to overthrow or assassinate Skanderbeg by any means, even offering a life pension of 100 golden ducats annually for the person who would kill him. During the conflict, Venice invited the Ottomans to attack Skanderbeg simultaneously from the east, facing the Albanians with a two-front conflict.

On 14 May 1448, an Ottoman army led by Sultan Murad II and his son Mehmed laid siege to the castle of Sfetigrad. The Albanian garrison in the castle resisted the frontal assaults of the Ottoman army, while Skanderbeg harassed the besieging forces with the remaining Albanian army under his personal command. On 23 July 1448, Skanderbeg won a battle near Shkodër against a Venetian army led by Andrea Venier. On 31 July 1448, due to a lack of potable water, the Albanian garrison eventually surrendered the castle with the condition of safe passage through the Ottoman besieging forces, a condition which was accepted and respected by Sultan Murad II. Primary sources disagree about the reason why the besieged had problems with the water in the castle: While Barleti and Biemmi maintained that a dead dog was found in the castle well, and the garrison refused to drink the water since it might corrupt their soul, another primary source, an Ottoman chronicler, conjectured that the Ottoman forces found and cut the water sources of the castle. Recent historians mostly concur with the Ottoman chronicler's version. Although his loss of men was minimal, Skanderbeg lost the castle of Sfetigrad, which was an important stronghold that controlled the fields of Macedonia to the east. At the same time, he besieged the towns of Durazzo (modern Durrës) and Lezhë which were then under Venetian rule. In August 1448, Skanderbeg defeated Mustafa Pasha in Dibër at the battle of Oranik. Mustafa Pasha lost 3,000 men and was captured, along with twelve high officers. Skanderbeg learned from these officers that it was the Venetians who pushed the Ottomans to invade Albania. The Venetians, upon hearing of the defeat, urged to establish peace. Mustafa Pasha was soon ransomed for 25,000 ducats to the Ottomans.

On 23 July 1448, Skanderbeg crossed the Drin River with 10,000 men, meeting a Venetian force of 15,000 men under the command of Daniele Iurichi, governor of Scutari. Skanderbeg instructed his troops on what to expect and opened battle by ordering a force of archers to open fire on the Venetian line. The battle continued for hours until large groups of Venetian troops began to flee. Skanderbeg, seeing his fleeing adversaries, ordered a full-scale offensive, routing the entire Venetian army. The Republic's soldiers were chased right to the gates of Scutari, and Venetian prisoners were thereafter paraded outside the fortress. The Albanians managed to inflict 2,500 casualties on the Venetian force, capturing 1,000. Skanderbeg's army suffered 400 casualties, most on the right wing. The peace treaty, negotiated by Georgius Pelino and signed between Skanderbeg and Venice on 4 October 1448, envisioned that Venice would keep Dagnum and its environs, but would cede to Skanderbeg the territory of Buzëgjarpri at the mouth of the river Drin, and also that Skanderbeg would enjoy the privilege of buying, tax-free, 200 horse-loads of salt annually from Durazzo. In addition, Venice would pay Skanderbeg 1,400 ducats. During the period of clashes with Venice, Skanderbeg intensified relations with Alfonso V of Aragon (r. 1416–1458), who was the main rival of Venice in the Adriatic, where his dreams for an empire were always opposed by the Venetians.

One of the reasons Skanderbeg agreed to sign the peace treaty with Venice was the advance of John Hunyadi's army in Kosovo and his invitation for Skanderbeg to join the expedition against the sultan. However, the Albanian army under Skanderbeg did not participate in this battle as he was prevented from joining with Hunyadi's army. It is believed that he was delayed by Đurađ Branković, then allied with Sultan Murad II, although Branković's exact role is disputed. Skanderbeg was outraged at the fact that he had been prevented from participating in a battle that could have changed the fate of his homeland if not the entirety of the Balkan Peninsula. As a result of this he let his armies raid into Kosovo, he then set fire to Serbian villages and slaughtered their inhabitants to punish Branković. He then returned to Krujë towards the end of November. Antonio Bonfini an Italian courtier of the Hungarian king believed the battle could have been won if Skanderbeg had participated. He appears to have marched to join Hunyadi immediately after making peace with the Venetians, and to have been only 20 miles from Kosovo Polje when the Hungarian army finally broke.

=== Siege of Krujë (1450) and its aftermath ===
In June 1450, two years after the Ottomans had captured Sfetigrad, they laid siege to Krujë with an army numbering approximately 100,000 men and led again by Sultan Murad II himself and his son, Mehmed II. Following a scorched earth strategy (thus denying the Ottomans the use of necessary local resources), Skanderbeg left a protective garrison of 1,500 men under one of his most trusted lieutenants, Vrana Konti, while, with the remainder of the army, which included many Slavs, Germans, Frenchmen and Italians, he harassed the Ottoman camps around Krujë by continuously attacking Sultan Murad II's supply caravans. The garrison repelled three major direct assaults on the city walls by the Ottomans, causing great losses to the besieging forces. Ottoman attempts at finding and cutting the water sources failed, as did a sapped tunnel, which collapsed suddenly. An offer of 300,000 aspra (Ottoman silver coins) and a promise of a high rank as an officer in the Ottoman army made to Vrana Konti, were both rejected by him.

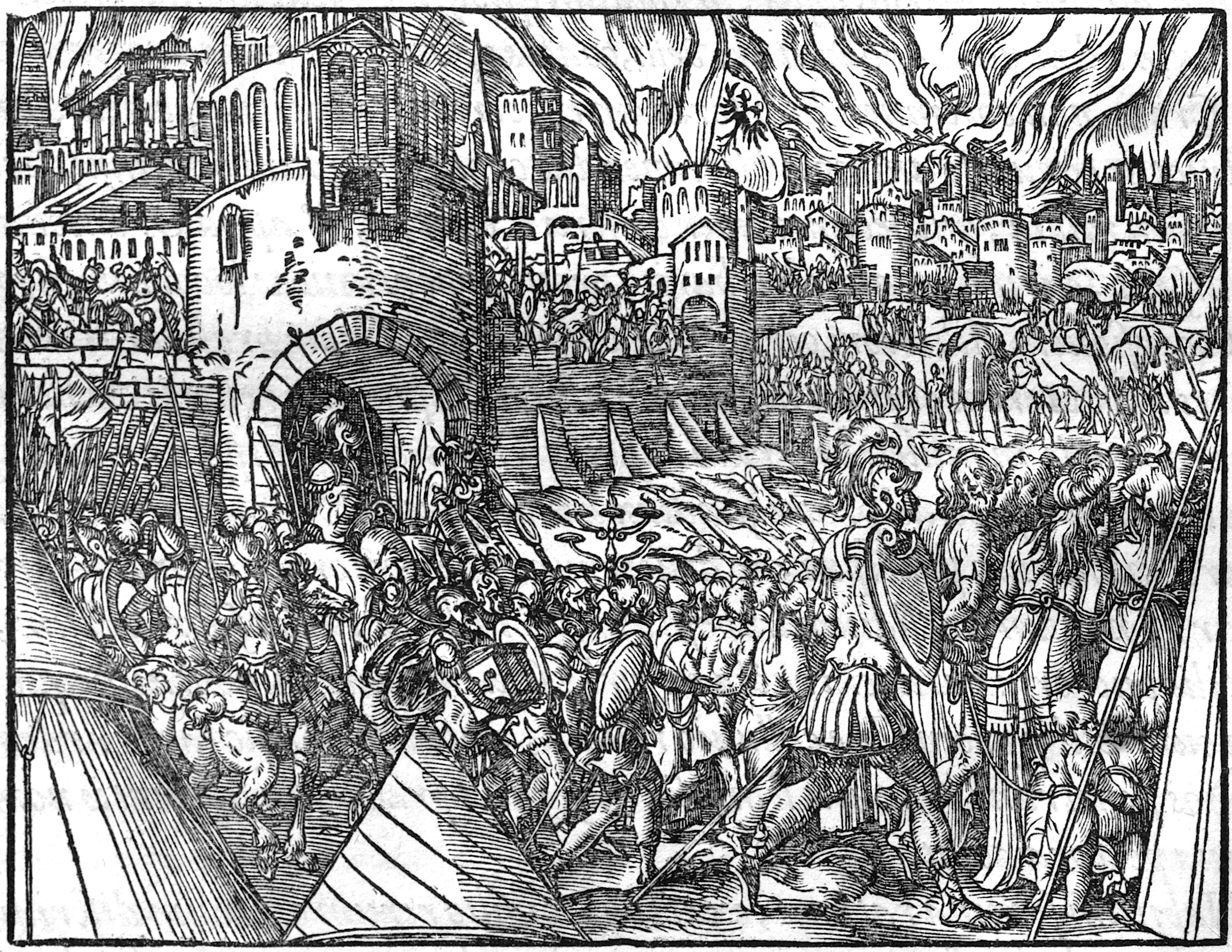
First Siege of Krujë, 1450, woodcut by Jost Amman

During the first siege of Krujë, the Venetian merchants from Scutari sold food to the Ottoman army and those of Durazzo supplied Skanderbeg's army. An angry attack by Skanderbeg on the Venetian caravans raised tension between him and the Republic, but the case was resolved with the help of the bailo of Durazzo who stopped the Venetian merchants from furnishing the Ottomans any longer. Venetian help to the Ottomans notwithstanding, by September 1450, the Ottoman camp was in disarray, as the castle was still not taken, the morale had sunk, and disease was running rampant. Murad II acknowledged that he could not capture the castle of Krujë by force of arms before the winter, and in October 1450, he lifted the siege and made his way to Edirne. The Ottomans suffered 20,000 casualties during the siege, and many more died as Murad escaped Albania. A few months later, on 3 February 1451, Murad died in Edirne and was succeeded by his son Mehmed II (r. 1451–1481).

After the siege, Skanderbeg was at the end of his resources. He lost all of his possessions except Krujë. The other nobles from the region of Albania allied with Murad II as he came to save them from the oppression. Even after the sultan's withdrawal, they rejected Skanderbeg's efforts to enforce his authority over their domains. Skanderbeg then traveled to Ragusa, urging for assistance, and the Ragusans informed Pope Nicholas V. Through financial assistance, Skanderbeg managed to hold Krujë and regain much of his territory. Skanderbeg's success brought praise from all over Europe and ambassadors were sent to him from Rome, Naples, Hungary, and Burgundy.

=== Consolidation ===
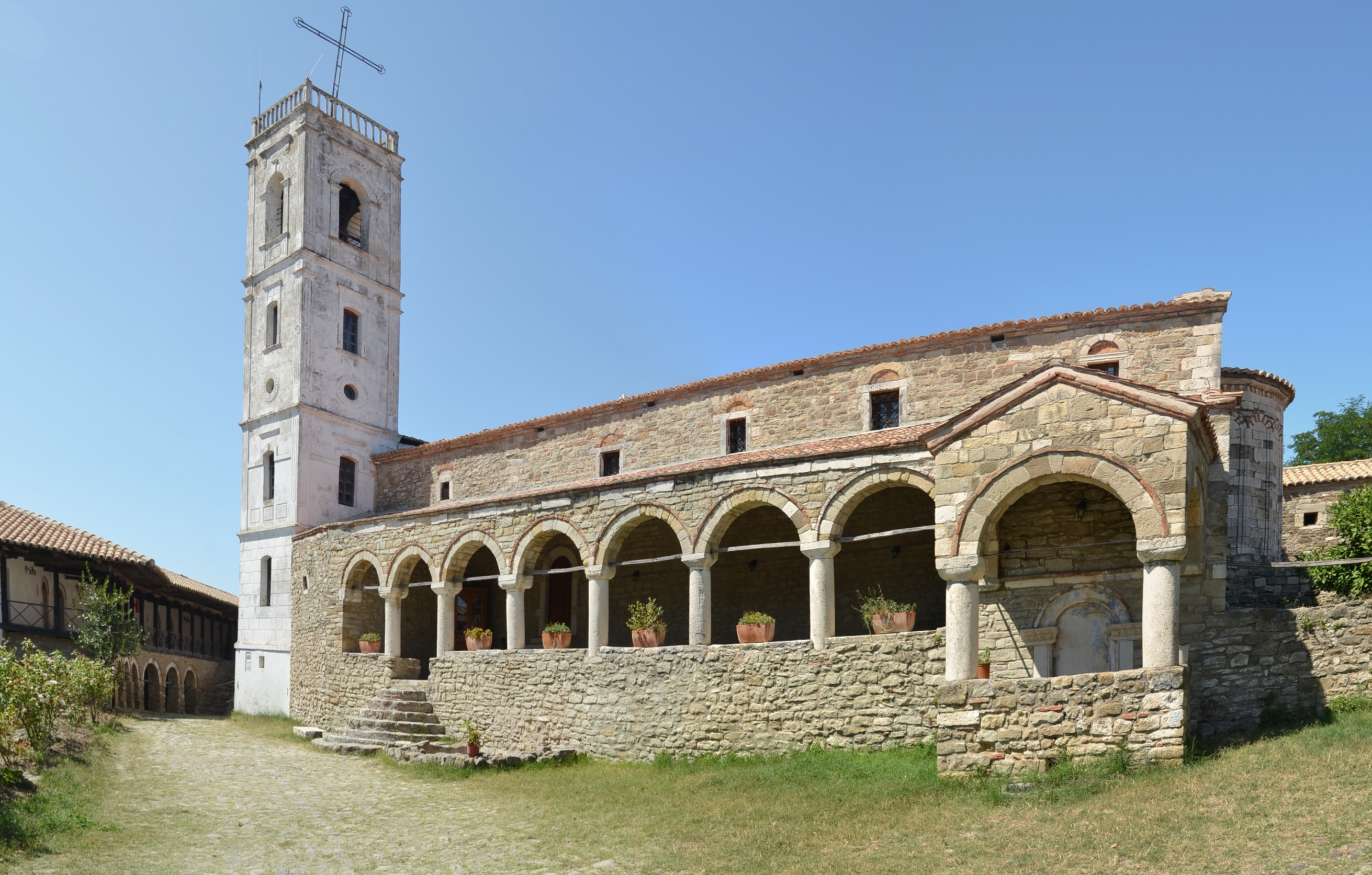
The Albanian Orthodox Ardenica Monastery, where Skanderbeg married Donika

Although Skanderbeg had achieved success in resisting Murad II himself, harvests were unproductive and famine was widespread. After being rejected by the Venetians, Skanderbeg established closer connections with King Alfonso V who, in January 1451, appointed him as "captain general of the king of Aragon". Following Skanderbeg's requests, King Alfonso V helped him in this situation and the two parties signed the Treaty of Gaeta on 26 March 1451, according to which Skanderbeg was formally a vassal in exchange for military aid. Authors have disagreed on whether Krujë belonged to Skanderbeg or to Alfonso V; while Constantin Marinescu claimed that Krujë no longer belonged to Skanderbeg, but to Alfonso, who exercised his power through his viceroy, this thesis was rejected by Athanas Gegaj, who claimed that the disproportion in numbers between the Spanish forces (100) and Skanderbeg's (around 10–15 thousand) clearly showed that the city belonged to Skanderbeg. It is presumed that Skanderbeg de facto had full control over his territories: while Naples' archives registered payments and supplies sent to Skanderbeg, they do not mention any kind of payment or tribute by Skanderbeg to Alfonso, except for various Ottoman war prisoners and banners sent by him as a gift to the King. More explicitly, Skanderbeg recognized Alfonso's sovereignty over his lands in exchange for help against the Ottomans. King Alfonso pledged to respect the old privileges of Krujë and Albanian territories and to pay Skanderbeg an annual 1,500 ducats, while Skanderbeg pledged to make his fealty to King Alfonso only after the expulsion of Ottomans from his lands, a condition never reached in Skanderbeg's lifetime.

Skanderbeg married Donika, the daughter of Gjergj Arianiti, one of the most influential Albanian noblemen, strengthening the ties between them, a month after the treaty on 21 April 1451 in the Albanian Orthodox Ardenica Monastery.

In 1451, Mehmed was focused on defeating the Karamanids and Menteşe in the East, but it was his intention to return to Albania. During this brief period of rest, Skanderbeg took up the rebuilding of Krujë and erected a new fortress in Modrica in the Drin Valley near Sfetigrad (which had been lost in a 1448 siege) where Ottoman forces had previously slipped through unhindered. The fortress was constructed in the heat of summer within a few months when few Ottoman posts were present. This came as a huge blow to Ottoman efforts whose Albanian operations were thus inhibited.

Right after the Treaty of Gaeta, Alfonso V signed other treaties with the rest of the most important Albanian noblemen, including Gjergj Arianiti, and with the Despot of the Morea, Demetrios Palaiologos. These efforts show that Alfonso thought about a crusade starting from Albania and Morea, which however never took place. Following the treaty, at the end of May 1451, a small detachment of 100 Catalan soldiers, headed by Bernard Vaquer, was established at the castle of Krujë. One year later, in May 1452, another Catalan nobleman, Ramon d'Ortafà, came to Krujë with the title of viceroy. In 1453, Skanderbeg paid a secret visit to Naples and the Vatican, probably to discuss the new conditions after the fall of Constantinople and the planning of a new crusade which Alfonso would have presented to Pope Nicholas V in a meeting in 1453–54. During the five years which followed the first siege of Krujë, Albania was allowed some respite as the new sultan set out to conquer the last vestiges of the Byzantine Empire, but in 1452 the newly acceded Ottoman Sultan Mehmed II ordered his first campaign against Skanderbeg. An expedition was sent under the dual-command of Tahip Pasha, the main commander, and Hamza Pasha, his subordinate, with an army of c. 25,000 men split between the two.

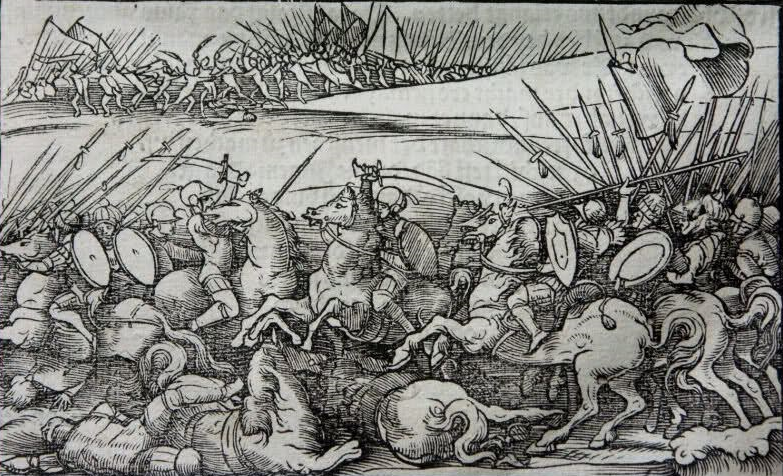
Skanderbeg's victory over the Ottomans in the Battle of Polog, 1453

Skanderbeg gathered 14,000 men and marched against the Ottoman army. Skanderbeg planned to first defeat Hamza and then to move around Tahip and encircle him. Skanderbeg did not give Hamza much time to prepare and, on 21 July, he assaulted immediately. The fierce attack made short work of the Ottoman force, resulting in them fleeing. The same day Skanderbeg attacked Tahip's army and defeated them, with Tahip killed and the Ottomans were thus left without their commander as they fled. Skanderbeg's victory over a ruler even more powerful than Murad came as a great surprise to the Albanians. During this period, skirmishes between Skanderbeg and the Dukagjini family, which had been dragging on for years, were put to an end by a reconciliatory intervention of the Pope, and in 1454, a peace treaty between them was finally reached.

On 22 April 1453, Mehmed sent another expedition to Albania under Ibrahim Pasha. The same day, despite the storms, Skanderbeg launched a swift cavalry attack which broke into the enemy camp causing disorder and chaos. Ibrahim was killed in action along with 3,000 of his men. Skanderbeg's army continued looting before returning to Debar. He returned triumphantly with his army with whom he had split his booty. Five weeks later Mehmed II captured Constantinople, which deeply troubled the Christian states of Europe. Mehmed, by then called "the Conqueror", turned his attention to finally defeating the Kingdom of Hungary and crossing into Italy.

Skanderbeg informed King Alfonso that he had conquered some territories and a castle, and Alfonso replied some days later that soon Ramon d'Ortafà would return to continue the war against the Ottomans and promised more troops and supplies. In the beginning of 1454, Skanderbeg and the Venetians informed King Alfonso and the Pope about a possible Ottoman invasion and asked for help. The Pope sent 3,000 ducats while Alfonso sent 500 infantry and a certain amount of money to Skanderbeg. Meanwhile, the Venetian Senate was resenting Skanderbeg's alliance with Naples, an old enemy of Venice. Frequently they delayed their tributes to Skanderbeg and this was long a matter of dispute between the parties, with Skanderbeg threatening war on Venice at least three times between 1448 and 1458, and Venice conceding in a conciliatory tone.

In June 1454, Ramon d'Ortafà returned to Krujë, this time with the title of viceroy of Albania, Greece, and Slavonia, with a personal letter to Skanderbeg as the Captain-General of the Neapolitan-aligned armed forces in parts of Albania (Magnifico et strenuo viro Georgio Castrioti, dicto Scandarbech, gentium armorum nostrarum in partibus Albanie generali capitaneo, consiliario fideli nobis dilecto). Along with d'Ortafà, King Alfonso V also sent the clerics Fra Lorenzo da Palerino and Fra Giovanni dell'Aquila to Albania with a flag embroidered with a white cross as a symbol of the Crusade which was about to begin. Even though this crusade never materialized, the Neapolitan troops were used in the Siege of Berat, where they were almost entirely annihilated and were never replaced.

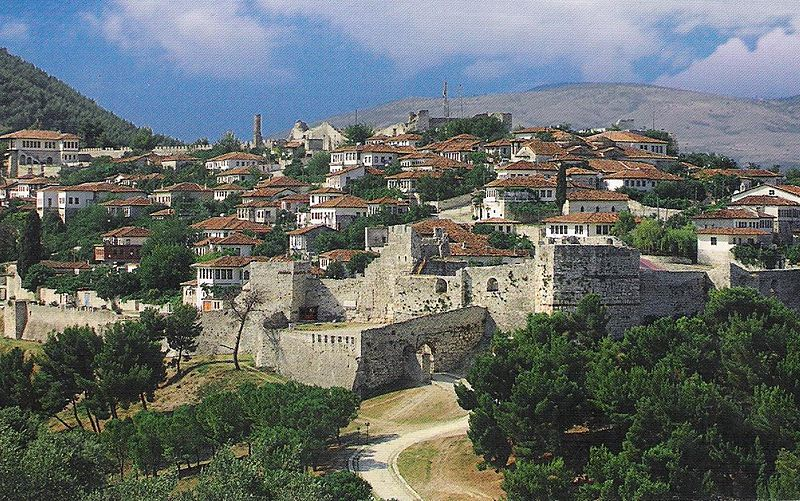
The citadel of Berat

The siege of Berat, the first real test between the armies of the new sultan and Skanderbeg, ended up in an Ottoman victory. Skanderbeg besieged the town's castle for months, causing the demoralized Ottoman officer in charge of the castle to promise his surrender. At that point, Skanderbeg relaxed his grip, split his forces, and departed the siege, leaving behind one of his generals, Karl Muzakë Thopia, and half of his cavalry on the banks of the Osum River in order to finalize the surrender. It was a costly error—the Ottomans saw this moment as an opportunity for attack and sent a large cavalry force, led by Isak-Beg, to reinforce the garrison. The Albanian forces had been lulled into a false sense of security, and the Ottomans caught the Albanian cavalry by surprise while they were resting on the banks of the Osum River, and almost all the 5,000 Albanian cavalry laying siege to Berat was killed. Most of the forces belonged to Gjergj Arianiti, whose role as Skanderbeg's greatest support diminished after the defeat. The attitude of other Albanian nobility was also somewhat affected.

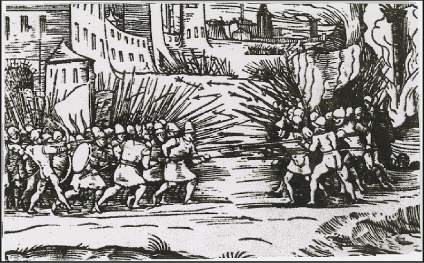
Second Battle of Oranik, 1456

Moisi Golemi defected to the Ottomans and returned to Albania in 1456 as the commander of an Ottoman army of 15,000 men, but he was defeated by Skanderbeg in the Battle of Oranik and lost his territory of Debar to Skanderbeg toward the end of March 1456. On 5 April 1456, Skanderbeg entered Kruja and Moisi fled to him professing his willingness to take up arms against the Ottomans, and Skanderbeg pardoned him, remaining loyal until his death in 1464. From time to time, Venice succeeded in stirring up Skanderbeg's relatives and weaker neighbors, who set up in opposition to him the elderly Gjergj Arianiti as "captain of all Albania" from Scutari to Durazzo in 1456, but in clan warfare Skanderbeg usually had the upper hand. Skanderbeg took over possessions of the Zenevisi and the Balšić as well. Skanderbeg's followers that ruled over northern Albania and all the chieftains on both sides of the Tomor mountains remained loyal to him.

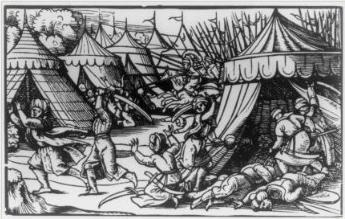
Engraving of an Albanian assault on the Ottoman camp during the Battle of Albulena, 1457

In 1456, one of Skanderbeg's nephews, George Strez Balšić, sold the Modrič fortress (now in North Macedonia) to the Ottomans for 30,000 silver ducats. He tried to cover up the act; however, his treason was discovered and he was sent to prison in Naples. In 1456, Skanderbeg's son, Gjon Kastrioti II, was born. Hamza Kastrioti, Skanderbeg's own nephew and his closest collaborator, lost his hope of succession after the birth of Skanderbeg's son and defected to the Ottomans in the same year. In the summer of 1457, an Ottoman army numbering approximately 70,000 men invaded Albania with the hope of destroying Albanian resistance once and for all. This army was led by Isak-Beg and Hamza Kastrioti, the commander who knew all about Albanian tactics and strategy. After wreaking much damage to the countryside, the Ottoman army set up camp at Ujebardha field, halfway between Lezhë and Krujë. After having avoided the enemy for months, calmly giving to the Ottomans and his European neighbours the impression that he was defeated, on 2 September Skanderbeg attacked the Ottoman forces in their encampments and defeated them killing 15,000 Ottomans, capturing 15,000 and 24 standards, and all the riches in the camp. This was one of the most famous victories of Skanderbeg over the Ottomans, which led to a five-year peace treaty with Sultan Mehmed II. Hamza was captured and sent to detention in Naples.

After the victorious Battle of Albulena, Skanderbeg's relations with the Papacy under Pope Calixtus III were intensified. The reason was that during this time, Skanderbeg's military undertakings involved considerable expense, which the contribution of Alfonso V of Aragon was not sufficient to defray. In 1457, Skanderbeg requested help from Calixtus III. Being himself in financial difficulties, the pope could do no more than send Skanderbeg a single galley and a modest sum of money, promising more ships and larger amounts of money in the future. On 23 December 1457, Calixtus III declared Skanderbeg a Captain-General of the Curia (Holy See) in the war against the Ottomans. The Pope gave him the title Athleta Christi, or Champion of Christ.

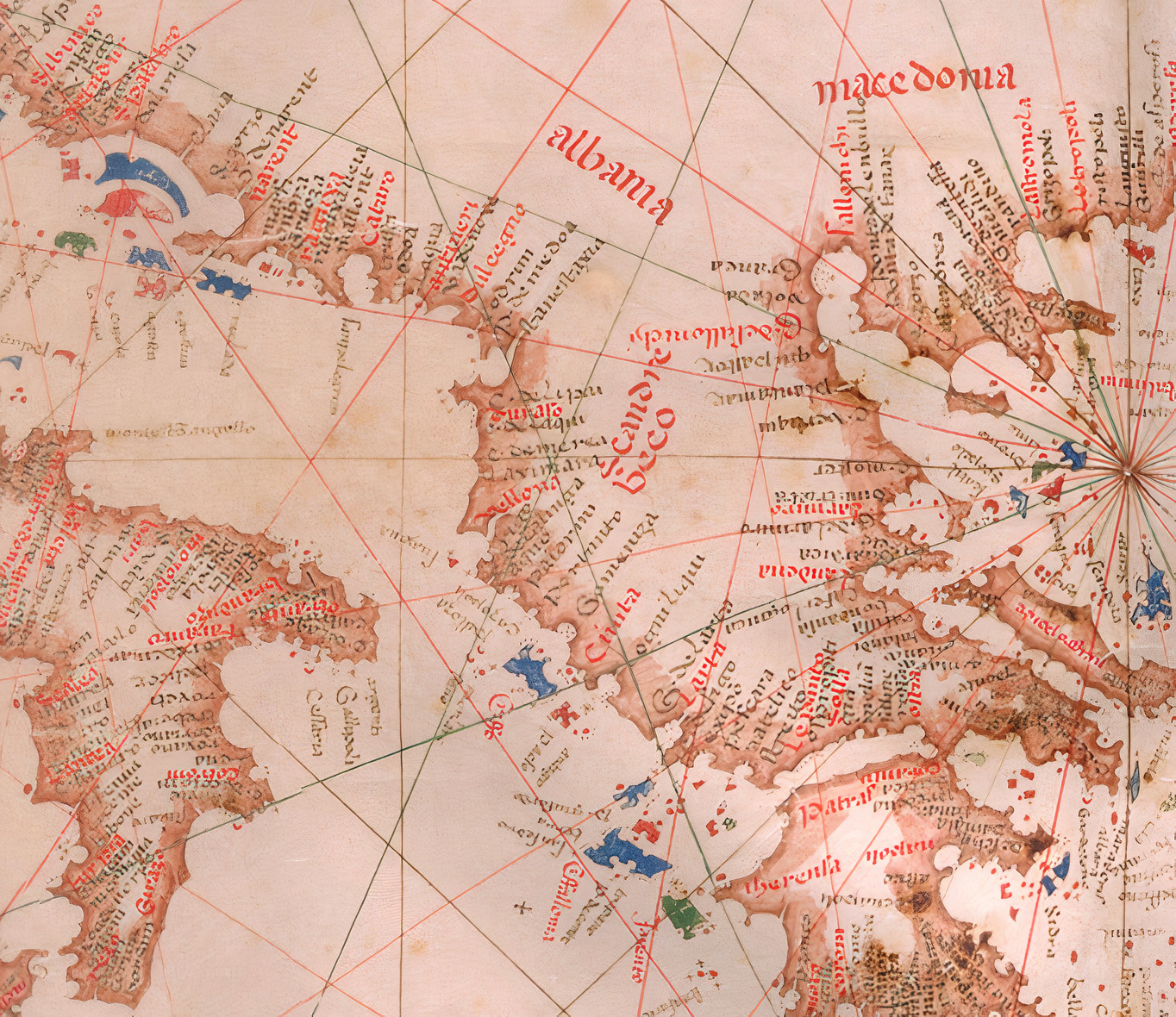
Nautical chart of medieval Albania in 1455 by Bartolomeo Pareto highlights the domains under the rule of Skanderbeg.

Meanwhile, Ragusa bluntly refused to release the funds which had been collected in Dalmatia for the crusade and which, according to the Pope, were to have been distributed in equal parts to Hungary, Bosnia, and Albania. The Ragusans even entered into negotiations with Mehmed. At the end of December 1457, Calixtus threatened Venice with an interdict and repeated the threat in February 1458. As the captain of the Curia, Skanderbeg appointed the duke of Leukas (Santa Maura), Leonardo III Tocco, formerly the prince of Arta and "despot of the Rhomaeans", a figure known in Southern Epirus, as a lieutenant in his native land.

On 27 June 1458, King Alfonso V died at Naples and Skanderbeg sent emissaries to his son and successor, King Ferdinand. According to historian C. Marinesco, the death of King Alfonso marked the end of the Aragonese dream of a Mediterranean Empire and also the hope for a new crusade in which Skanderbeg was assigned a leading role. The relationship of Skanderbeg with the Kingdom of Naples continued after Alfonso V's death, but the situation had changed. Ferdinand I was not as able as his father and now it was Skanderbeg's turn to help King Ferdinand regain and maintain his kingdom. In 1459 Skanderbeg captured the fortress of Sati from the Ottoman Empire and ceded it to Venice in order to secure a cordial relationship with Signoria. The reconciliation reached the point where Pope Pius II suggested entrusting Skanderbeg's dominions to Venice during his Italian expedition.

After Serbian Despot Stefan Branković was dethroned in April 1459, he traveled to Albania and stayed with Skanderbeg and supported his anti-Ottoman activities, forging plans to recapture Serbia from the Ottomans and return to Smederevo. In November 1460 Despot Stefan married Angelina Arianiti, the sister of Skanderbeg's wife Donika. Skanderbeg gave the dethroned Despot Stefan an unknown estate as appanage. With Skanderbeg's recommendations, Despot Stefan moved to Italy in 1461 or 1466.

=== Italian expedition: 1460 to 1462 ===
Skanderbeg's military expedition to Italy 1460–1462. The northern route was taken by himself, whereas the southern one was taken by his subordinates.

In 1460, King Ferdinand had serious problems with another uprising of the Angevins and asked for help from Skanderbeg. This invitation worried King Ferdinand's opponents, and Sigismondo Pandolfo Malatesta declared that if Ferdinand of Naples received Skanderbeg, Malatesta would go to the Ottomans. In the month of September 1460, Skanderbeg dispatched a company of 500 cavalry under his nephew, Ivan Strez Balšić.

"The Prince of Taranto wrote me a letter, a copy of which, and the reply I made him, I am sending to Your Majesty. I am very surprised that His Lordship should think to turn me from my intention by his brusque words, and I should like to say one thing: may God guard Your Majesty from ill and harm and danger, but however things may turn out I am the friend of virtue and not fortune."

— Skanderbeg's letter to Ferdinand I of Naples

Ferdinand's main rival Prince of Taranto Giovanni Antonio Orsini tried to dissuade Skanderbeg from this enterprise and even offered him an alliance. This did not affect Skanderbeg, who answered on 31 October 1460, that he owed fealty to the Aragon family, especially in times of hardship. In his response to Orsini, Skanderbeg mentioned that the Albanians never betray their friends and that they are the descendants of Pyrrhus of Epirus, and reminded Orsini of Pyrrhus' victories in southern Italy. When the situation became critical, Skanderbeg made a three-year armistice with the Ottomans on 17 April 1461, and in late August 1461, landed in Apulia with an expeditionary force of 1,000 cavalry and 2,000 infantry. At Barletta and Trani, he managed to help defeat the Italian and Angevin forces of Orsini of Taranto, chiefly at the battle of Troia, secured King Ferdinand's throne, and returned to Albania. King Ferdinand was grateful to Skanderbeg for this intervention for the rest of his life: at Skanderbeg's death, he rewarded his descendants with the castle of Trani, and the properties of Monte Sant'Angelo and San Giovanni Rotondo.

=== Skanderbeg's letter to the Prince of Taranto ===
"Moreover, you scorn our people, claiming the Albanians as nothing more than sheep, and according to your customs think of us with only insults. It would seem you know nothing of the origins of our race. Our elders were the Epirotes from whence Pyrrhus himself came forth, the might of whom the Romans could barely withstand. Those very Epirotes whom with their weapons set forth and conquered Taranto and much of Italy.

There exists no challenge to their might from the likes of the Tarentines, a species of wet men born only to catch fish.

And since you proclaim Albania a part of Macedonia, then you grant also our elders as nobles who went as far as India under Alexander the Great, defeating all the peoples that came before them with great ease.

From those men descend these who you call sheep. But the nature of things is not changed. Why do your men run away in the faces of sheep?"

— Skanderbeg's letter to the Prince of Taranto

In his letter, Skanderbeg clearly asserted his Albanian heritage, stating that the Albanians were descendants of the ancient Epirotes and Pyrrhus himself.

The Prince of Taranto asserted that the Albanians were descended from the ancient Macedonians.

=== Last years ===
After securing Naples, Skanderbeg returned home after being informed of Ottoman movements. There were three Ottoman armies approaching Albania. The first, under the command of Sinan Pasha, was defeated at Mokra (in Makedonski Brod). Upon hearing of the defeat, Mehmed II dispatched a second army under Hasan Bey. Skanderbeg and Hasan confronted each other in Mokra where the latter was defeated and lost the majority of his forces as well as being wounded himself, he surrendered to Skanderbeg and was imprisoned. The second army, under the command of Hasan bey, was defeated in Ohrid, where the Ottoman commander was captured. The third Ottoman army, a force of 30,000 under Karaza bey was defeated in the region of Skopje. This forced Sultan Mehmed II to agree to a 10-year armistice which was signed in April 1463 in Skopje. Skanderbeg did not want peace, but Tanush Thopia's willingness for peace prevailed. Tanush himself went to Tivoli to explain to the Pope why Skanderbeg had opted for peace with Mehmed II. He pointed out that Skanderbeg would be ready to go back to war should the Pope ask for it.

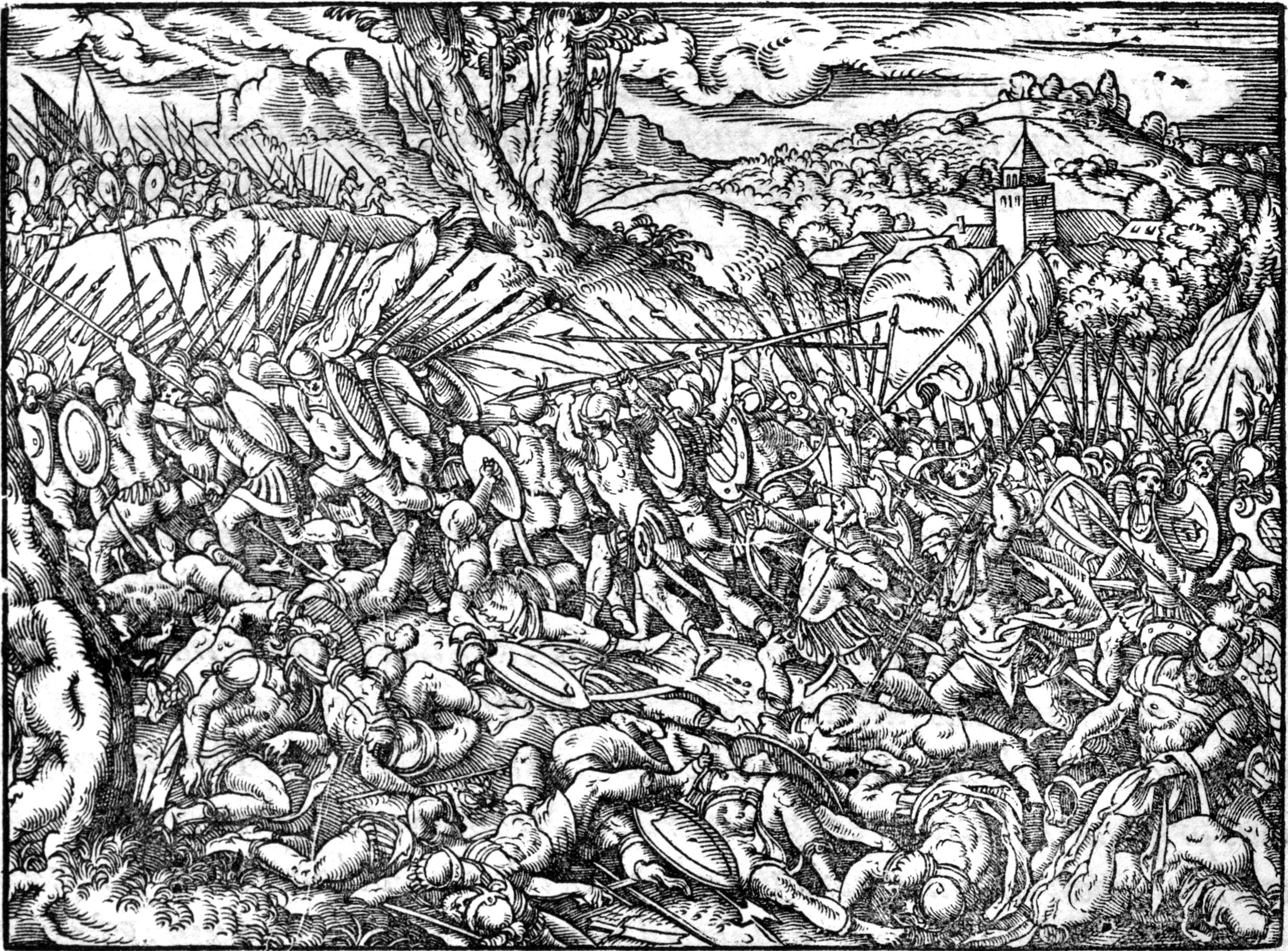
Skanderbeg's victory with the Venetians over the Ottomans in the Battle of Ohrid in 1464

Meanwhile, the position of Venice towards Skanderbeg had changed perceptibly because it entered a war with the Ottomans (1463–79). During this period Venice saw Skanderbeg as an invaluable ally, and on 20 August 1463, the 1448 peace treaty was renewed with other conditions added: the right of asylum in Venice, an article stipulating that any Venetian–Ottoman treaty would include a guarantee of Albanian independence, and allowing the presence of several Venetian ships in the Adriatic around Lezhë. In November 1463, Pope Pius II tried to organize a new crusade against the Ottomans, similar to what Pope Nicholas V and Pope Calixtus III had tried before. Pius II invited all Christian nobility to join, and the Venetians immediately answered the call. So did Skanderbeg, who on 27 November 1463 declared war on the Ottomans when a force of 14,000 was sent under the command of Şeremet bey to reinforce fortresses in the area of Ohrid. Due to the upcoming crusade, the Republic of Venice decided to aid Skanderbeg by sending 500 cavalry and 500 infantry under the condottiero Antonio da Cosenza, also known as Cimarosto. On 14 or 15 September after luring the Ottomans out of the gates of Ohrid and feigning a retreat, Skanderbeg's forces assaulted and defeated the Ottoman garrison. Şeremet lost 10,000 men and his son was captured. The remainder of the Ottoman forces were pursued by the Albanian-Venetian forces. Pius II's planned crusade envisioned assembling 20,000 soldiers in Taranto, while another 20,000 would be gathered by Skanderbeg. They would have been marshalled in Durazzo under Skanderbeg's leadership and would have formed the central front against the Ottomans. However, Pius II died in August 1464, at the crucial moment when the crusading armies were gathering and preparing to march in Ancona, and Skanderbeg was again left alone facing the Ottomans.

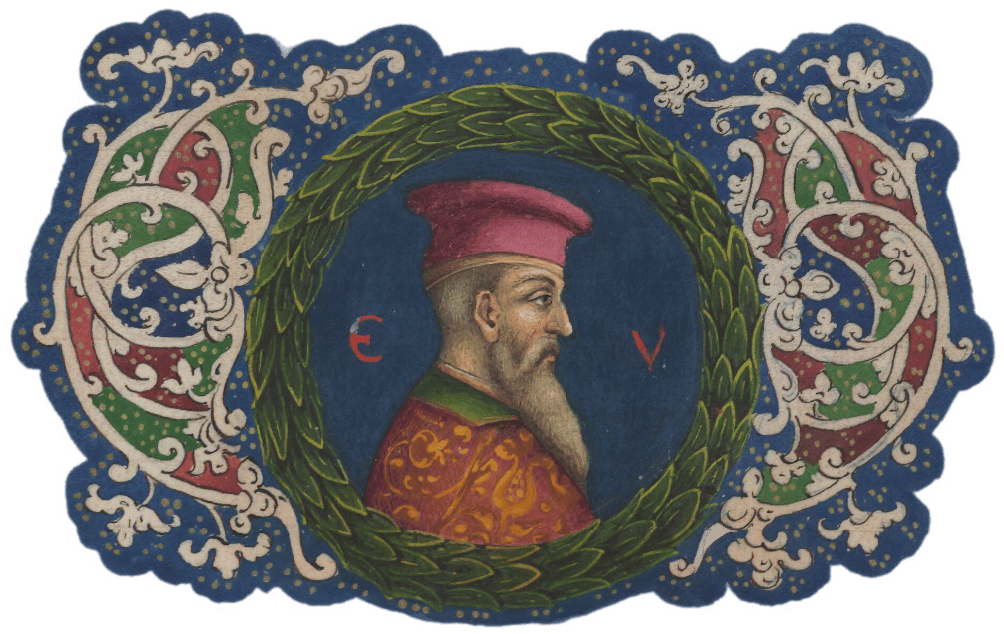
One of the oldest illustrations of Skanderbeg: a miniature included in De Romanorum magistratibus, sacerdotiisque Romanorum of Lucio Fenestella (pseudonym of Andrea Domenico Fiocco), first printed in 1465

In April 1465, at the Battle of Vaikal, Skanderbeg fought and defeated Ballaban Badera, an Ottoman Albanian sanjakbey of Ohrid. However, during an ambush in the same battle, Ballaban managed to capture some important Albanian noblemen, including cavalry commander Moisi Golemi, chief army quartermaster Vladan Gjurica, Skanderbeg's nephew Muzaka, and 18 other officers. These were immediately sent to Constantinople where they were skinned alive for fifteen days and later cut to pieces and thrown to the dogs. Skanderbeg's pleas to have them back, by either ransom or prisoner exchange, failed. Later that same year, two other Ottoman armies appeared on the borders. The commander of one of the Ottoman armies was Ballaban Pasha, who, together with Jakup Bey, the commander of the second army, planned a double-flank envelopment. Skanderbeg, however, attacked Ballaban's forces at the Second Battle of Vajkal, where the Ottomans were defeated. This time, all Ottoman prisoners were slain in an act of revenge for the previous execution of Albanian captains. The other Ottoman army, under the command of Jakup Bey, was also defeated some days later in Kashari field near Tirana.

==== Second siege of Krujë and its aftermath ====
In 1466, Sultan Mehmed II personally led an army of 30,000 into Albania and laid the second siege of Krujë, as his father had attempted 16 years earlier. The town was defended by a garrison of 4,400 men, led by Prince Tanush Thopia. After several months of siege, destruction and killings all over the country, Mehmed II, like his father, saw that seizing Krujë was impossible for him to accomplish by force of arms. Subsequently, he left the siege to return to Istanbul. However, he left the force of 30,000 men under Ballaban Pasha to maintain the siege by building a castle in central Albania, which he named Il-basan (modern Elbasan), in order to support the siege. Durazzo would be the next target of the sultan in order to be used as a strong base opposite the Italian coast.

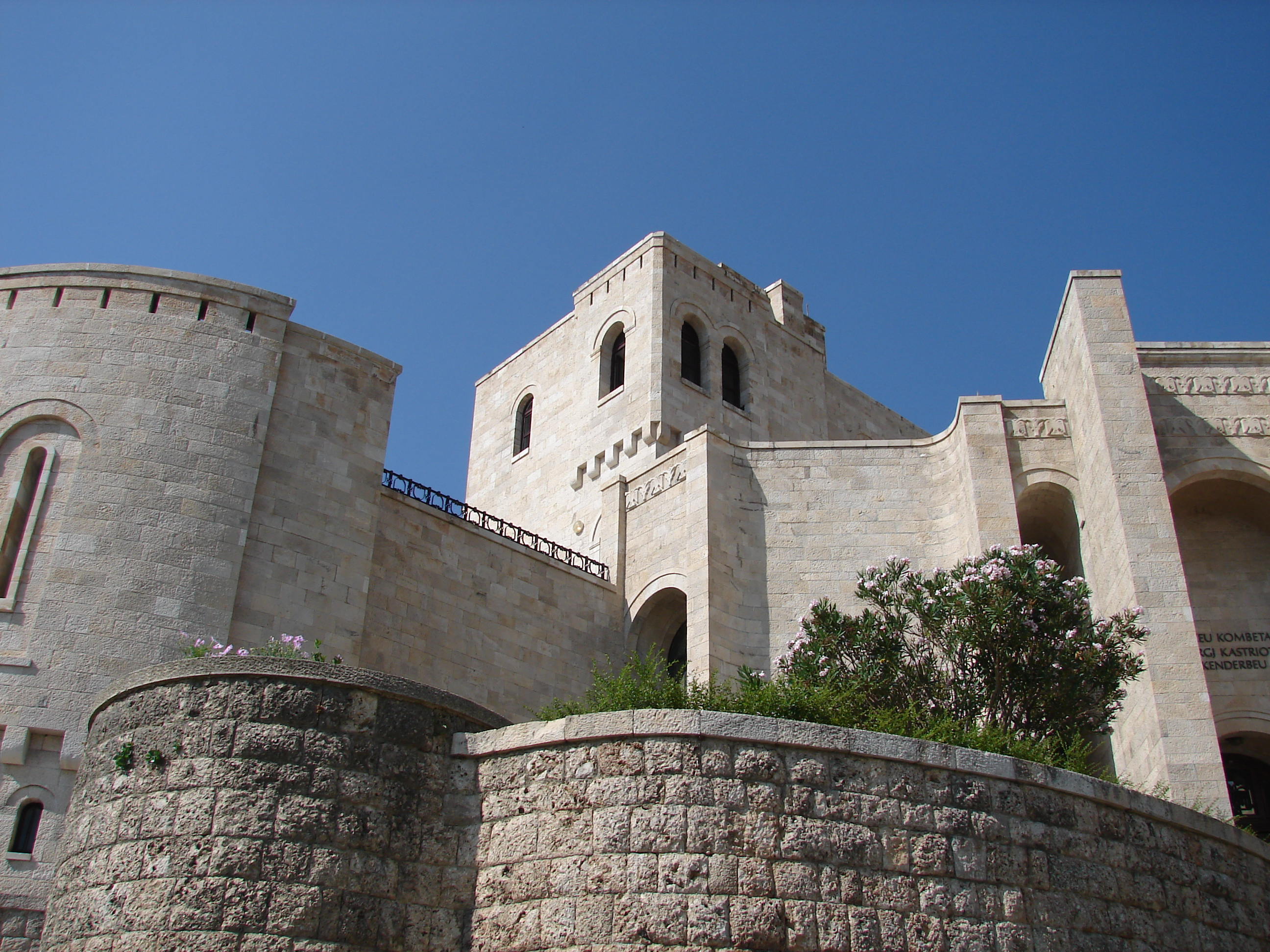
Skanderbeg Museum in Krujë

In 1466, on his return trip to Istanbul, Mehmed II expatriated Dorotheos, the Archbishop of Ohrid and his clerks and boyars because of their anti-Ottoman activities and collaboration with rebels from Albania during Skanderbeg's rebellion.

Skanderbeg spent the following winter of 1466–67 in Italy, of which several weeks were spent in Rome trying to persuade Pope Paul II to give him money. At one point, he was unable to pay for his hotel bill, and he commented bitterly that he should be fighting against the Church rather than the Ottomans. Only when Skanderbeg left for Naples did Pope Paul II give him 2,300 ducats. The court of Naples, whose policy in the Balkans hinged on Skanderbeg's resistance, was more generous with money, armaments, and supplies. However, it is probably better to say that Skanderbeg financed and equipped his troops largely from local resources, richly supplemented by Ottoman booty. It is safe to say that the papacy was generous with praise and encouragement, but its financial subsidies were limited. It is possible that the Curia only provided Skanderbeg 20,000 ducats in all, which could have paid the wages of 20 men over the whole period of conflict.

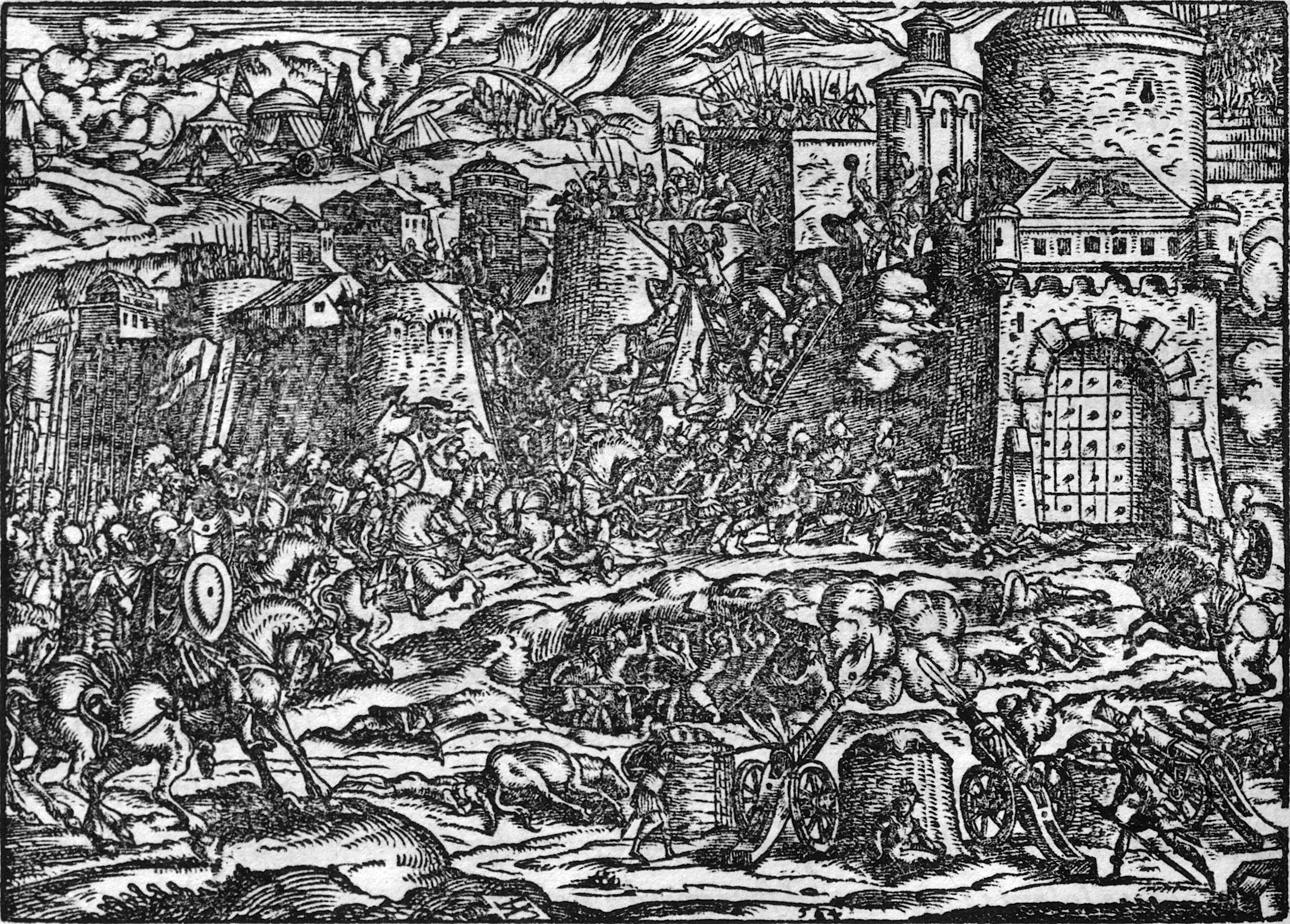
Second Siege of Krujë 1466–67 – The Albanian-Venetian force under Skanderbeg successfully repelled the siege led by Mehmed II and Ballaban Pasha.

However, on his return he allied with Lekë Dukagjini, and together on 19 April 1467, they first attacked and defeated, in the Krrabë region, the Ottoman reinforcements commanded by Yonuz, Ballaban's brother. Yonuz himself and his son, Haydar were taken prisoner. Four days later, on 23 April 1467, they attacked the Ottoman forces laying siege to Krujë. The second siege of Krujë was eventually broken, resulting in the death of Ballaban Pasha by an Albanian arquebusier named George Aleksi.

With the death of Ballaban, Ottoman forces were left surrounded and according to Bernandino de Geraldinis, a Neapolitan functionary, 10,000 men remained in the besieging camp. Those inside the encirclement asked to leave freely to Ottoman territory, offering to surrender all that was within the camp to the Albanians. Skanderbeg was prepared to accept, but many nobles refused. The Albanians thus began to annihilate the surrounded Ottoman army before they cut a narrow path through their opponents and fled through Dibra. On 23 April 1467, Skanderbeg entered Krujë. The victory was well-received among the Albanians, and Skanderbeg's recruits increased as documented by Geraldini: Skanderbeg was in his camp with 16,000 men and every day his camp grows with young warriors. The victory was also well received in Italy with contemporaries hoping for more such news. Meanwhile, the Venetians had taken advantage of Mehmed's absence in Albania and sent a fleet under Vettore Capello into the Aegean. Capello attacked and occupied the islands of Imbros and Lemnos after which he sailed back and laid siege to Patras. Ömer Bey, the Ottoman commander in Greece, led a relief force to Patras where he was initially repelled before turning on his pursuers, forcing them to flee, ending their campaign.

After these events, Skanderbeg's forces besieged Elbasan but failed to capture it because of the lack of artillery and a sufficient number of soldiers.

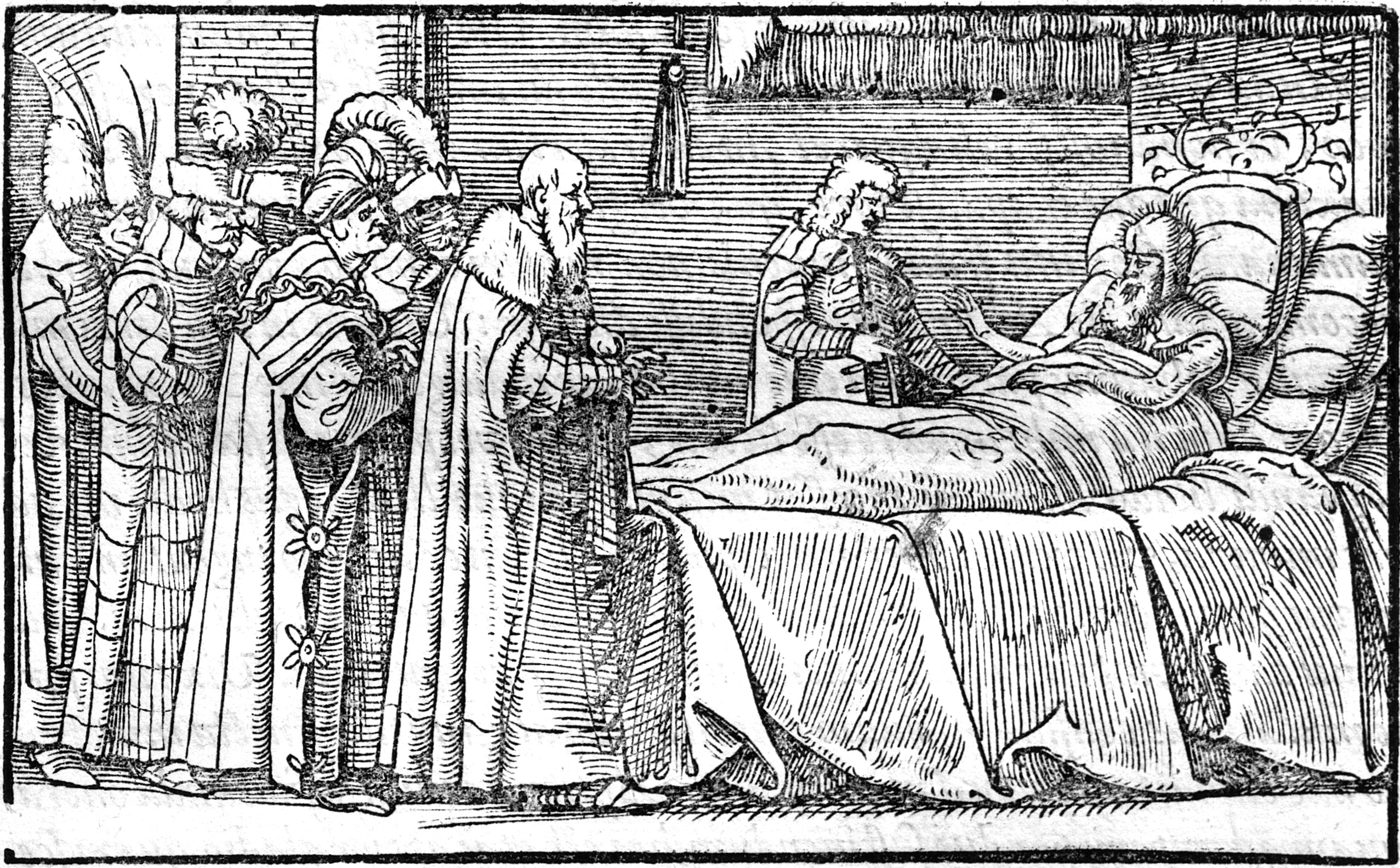
The death of Skanderbeg – 16th-century German engraving

The destruction of Ballaban Pasha's army and the siege of Elbasan forced Mehmed II to march against Skanderbeg again in the summer of 1467. Skanderbeg retreated to the mountains while Ottoman grand vizier Mahmud Pasha Angelović pursued him but failed to find him because Skanderbeg succeeded in fleeing to the coast. Mehmed II energetically pursued the attacks against the Albanian strongholds while sending detachments to raid the Venetian possessions (especially Durazzo) and to keep them isolated. The Ottomans failed again, in their third siege of Krujë, to take the city and subjugate the country, but the degree of destruction was immense.

During the Ottoman incursions, the Albanians suffered a great number of casualties, especially to the civilian population, while the economy of the country was in ruins. The above problems, the loss of many Albanian noblemen, and the new alliance with Lekë Dukagjini, caused Skanderbeg to call together in January 1468 all the remaining Albanian noblemen to a conference in the Venetian stronghold of Lezhë to discuss the new war strategy and to restructure what remained from the League of Lezhë. During that period, Skanderbeg fell ill – either with malaria, or, it was rumored, from poison – and died on 17 January 1468, aged 62.

== Aftermath ==
In Western Europe, the death of Skanderbeg was mourned by princes and other rulers such as Ferdinand I. In a condolence letter written to Skanderbeg's widow dated 24 February 1468, Ferdinand expressed pain at having lost his friend and promised assistance to Skanderbeg's family. During Skanderbeg's lifetime, his assistance to King Alphonse I by sending troops to quell an uprising and later his expedition to suppress a revolt on behalf of King Ferdinand led to Albanian mercenaries and other soldiers being allowed by the Neapolitan monarchs to settle villages in Southern Italy. With the death of Skanderbeg and the conquest of his domains by the Ottomans, Albanian leaders and other Albanians found refuge in the Kingdom of Naples. These events and migrations contributed to the formation of the Arbëresh community and many of their settlements in southern Italy that still exist in the modern era.

Ivan Strez Balšić was perceived by Venice as Skanderbeg's successor. After Skanderbeg's death Ivan and his brother Gojko Balšić, together with Leke, Progon and Nicholas Dukagjini, continued to fight for Venice. In 1469 Ivan requested from the Venetian Senate to return to him his confiscated property consisting of Castle Petrela, voivodate of "Terra nuova" of Kruje (unknown position), territory between Kruje and Durrës and villages in the region of Bushnesh (today part of the Kodër-Thumanë municipality). Venice largely conceded to the wishes of Ivan Balšić and installed him as Skanderbeg's successor.

After Skanderbeg's death, Venice asked and obtained from his widow the permission to defend Krujë and the other fortresses with Venetian garrisons. Krujë held out during its fourth siege, started in 1477 by Gedik Ahmed Pasha, until 16 June 1478, when the city was starved to death and finally surrendered to Sultan Mehmed II himself. Demoralized and severely weakened by hunger and lack of supplies from the year-long siege, the defenders surrendered to Mehmed, who had promised to allow them to leave unharmed in exchange. As the Albanians were walking away with their families, however, the Ottomans killed the men and enslaved the women and children. In 1479, an Ottoman army, headed again by Mehmed II, besieged and captured Shkodër, reducing Venice's Albanian possessions to only Durazzo, Antivari, and Dulcigno. Skanderbeg's son Gjon Kastrioti II continued the resistance against the Ottomans, and tried to capture territories from Ottoman rule in 1481–84. In addition, a major revolt in 1492 occurred in southern Albania, mainly in the Labëria region, and Bayazid II was personally involved with crushing the resistance. In 1501, George Castriot II, grandson of Skanderbeg and son of Gjon Kastrioti II, along with Progon Dukagjini and around 150–200 stratioti, went to Lezhë and organized a local uprising, but that too was unsuccessful. The Venetians evacuated Durazzo in 1501.

In 1594, there was a new attempt to liberate Albania from the Ottoman Empire. Albanian leaders gathered in Lezhë to plan a new revolt with the help of Pope Clement VII. But the Pope never sent his help, and the 40 thousand Albanian soldiers stopped their attempt. After the fall of Albania to the Ottomans the Kingdom of Naples gave land and noble title to Skanderbeg's family, the Castriota. His family was given control over the Duchy of San Pietro in Galatina and the County of Soleto in the Province of Lecce, Italy. His son, Gjon Kastrioti II, married Jerina Branković, daughter of Serbian despot Lazar Branković and one of the last descendants of the Palaiologos. There are two patrilineal branches of the Kastrioti family that exist today: the branch of Lecce with two sub-branches and the branch of Naples with one sub-branch. Both branches are patrilineally descended from the sons of Ferrante (–1561), Duke of Galatina and Count of Spoleto.

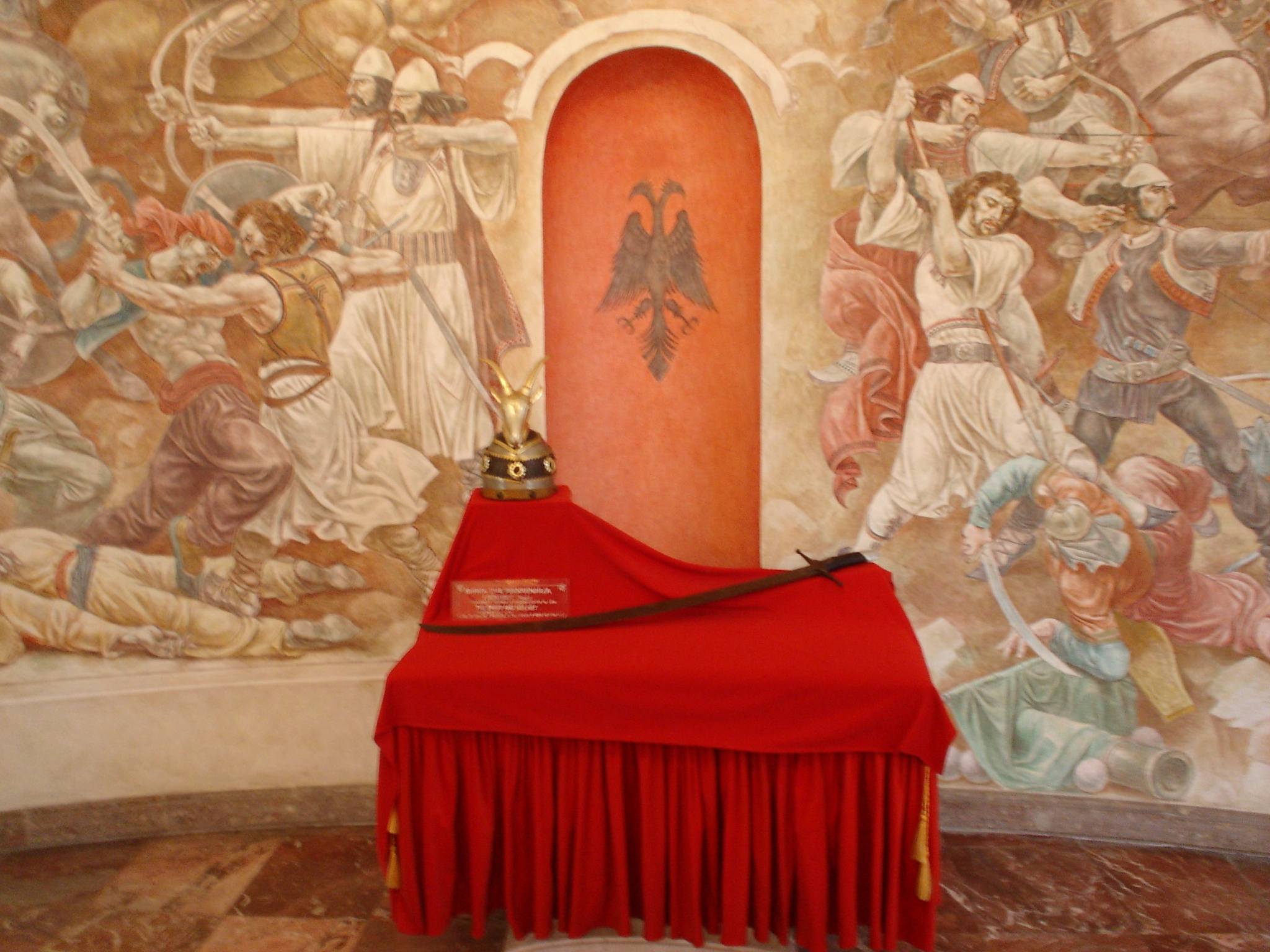
Mural commemorating a battle of Skanderbeg. The Arms of Skanderbeg visible in the forefront are copies of the originals held at the Imperial Armoury of Vienna.

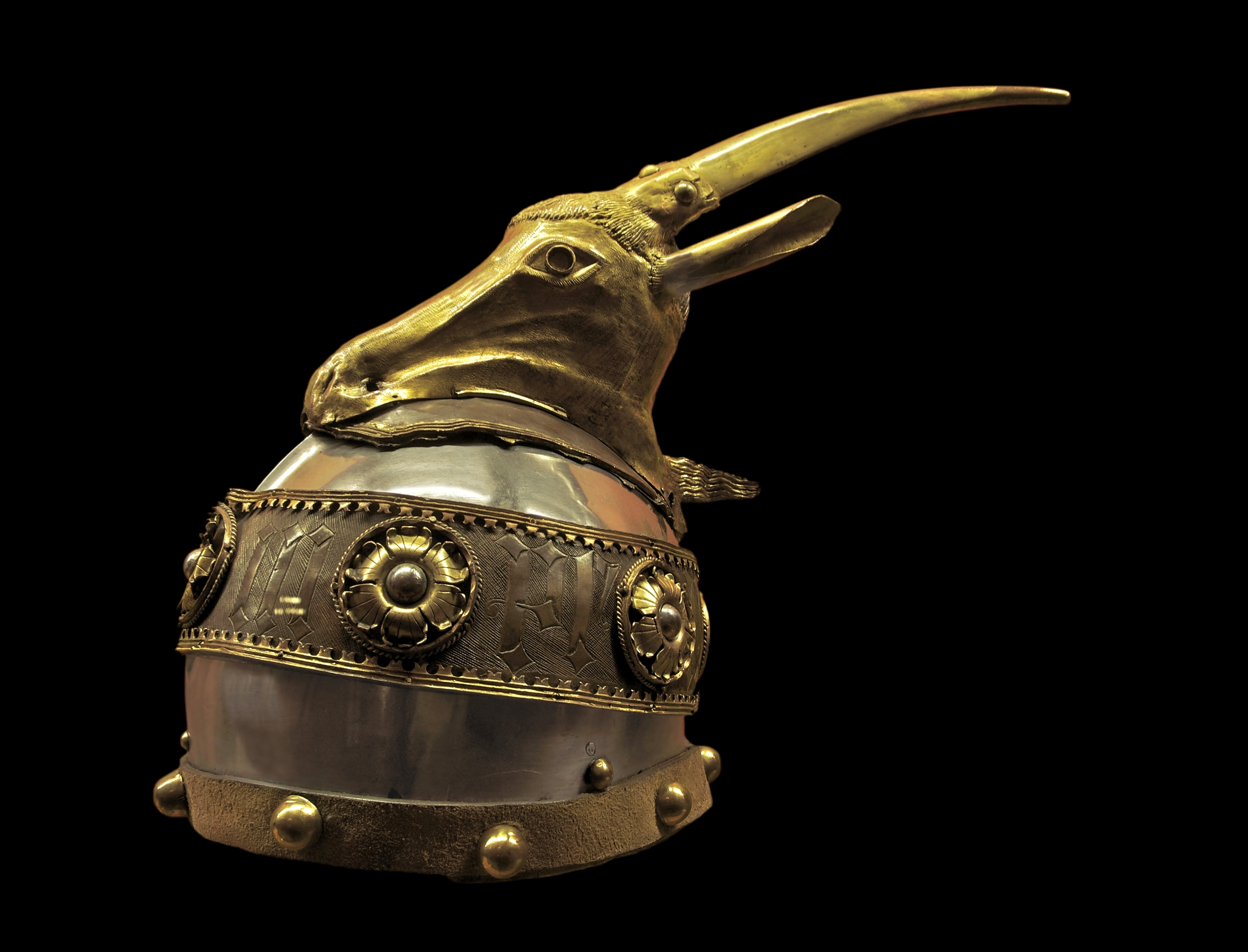
The Skanderbeg Helmet, attributed to Skanderbeg in the second half of the 16th century by Archduke Ferdinand II

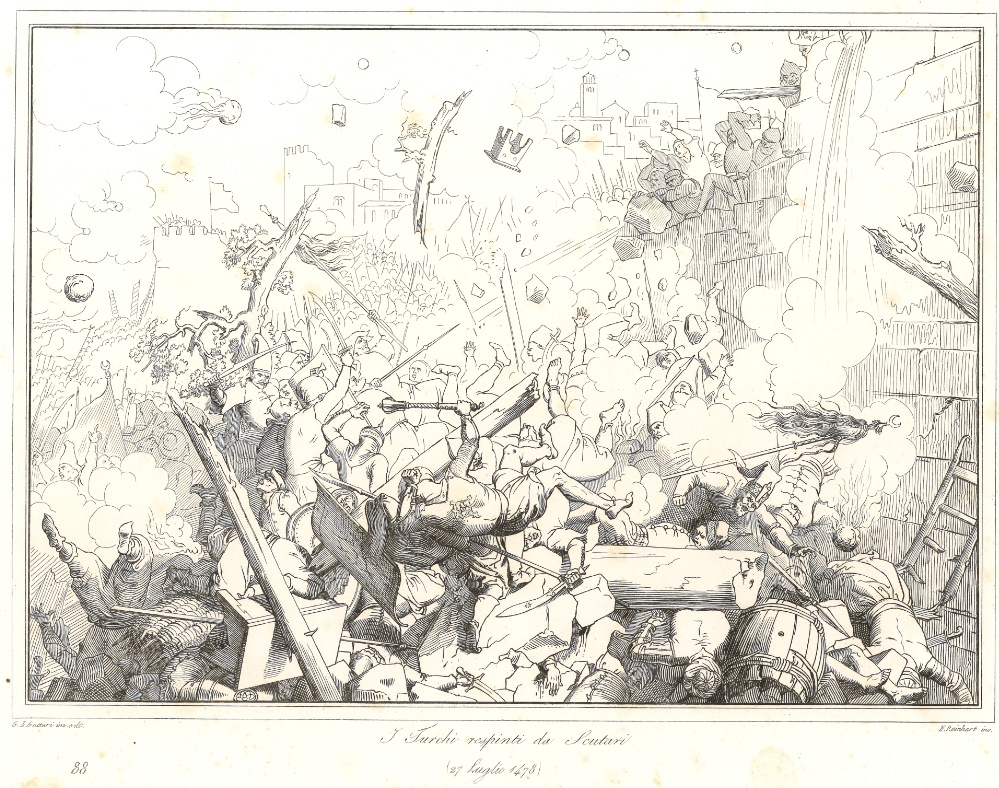
Siege of Shkodër 1478

== Physical appearance and personality ==
He was described as "tall and slender with a prominent chest, wide shoulders, long neck, and high forehead. He had black hair, fiery eyes, and a powerful voice."

Rather than challenge or break him, the brutal Janissary training young Skanderbeg was subjected to only complemented what was already in his soul: a penchant for war. Before being taken hostage, in his youth as an adolescent, he used to "vigorously train himself on the crest of Mount Croya or elsewhere. Come blizzard or frozen hell, he would then choose to sleep over improvised beds of snow. In the scorching heat of summer, he would again and again keep hardening himself like an invincible guerrilla [fighter]."

Accounts of his legendary strength state that his sword swing could, like Godfrey of Bouillon, cleave a man or animal in two.

Marin Barletius, a contemporary and chief biographer of Skanderbeg, provides one of the earliest descriptions of him. After a Tatar who was envious of a young 21 year old Skanderbeg's growing reputation at the Ottoman court challenged him to a duel to the death, the Albanian stripped to his waist and warned his boastful contender not to violate the rules of honor:

Scanderbeg, both by voice and countenance, betrayed a wonderful resolution and assurance. And the [Ottoman] audience was impressed with his manly perfection. His arms looked as if nothing like them had ever been seen. His neck was strong and somewhat bending, such as possessed by wrestlers. His shoulders were big and marvelously spread. The color of his visage was fair and white…. And the cast of his eyes was straight and pleasant, without any blemish or imperfection…. Like Alexander the Great, he was built like a giant. Physically he was invincible.

During their match, Skanderbeg struck off his opponent's head with a sword swing and held aloft the severed trophy before Murad, thereby winning the sultan's favor.

== Legacy ==
The secret seal of Skanderbeg was likely made of a precious stone, a sort of engraved gem molded into a ring. It shows the mythological Aetolian princess Leda wearing a phrygian cap – similar to the one seen in a 1584 portrait of Skanderbeg by French author André Thevet – with her back exposed and gently lifting her gown, while sitting upright next to the Zeus of Dodona in the form of a swan. The seal is thought to have been used around the year 1459.

The Ottoman Empire's expansion ground to a halt during the time that Skanderbeg's forces resisted. He has been credited with being one of the main reasons for the delay of Ottoman expansion into Western Europe, giving the Italian principalities more time to better prepare for the Ottoman arrival. While the Albanian resistance certainly played a vital role, it was one of numerous relevant events that played out in the mid-15th century. Much credit must also go to the successful resistance mounted by Vlad III Dracula in Wallachia and Stephen III the Great of Moldavia, who dealt the Ottomans their worst defeat at Vaslui, among many others, as well as the defeats inflicted upon the Ottomans by Hunyadi and his Hungarian forces. Skanderbeg is considered today a commanding figure not only in the national consciousness of Albanians but also of 15th-century European history. According to archival documents, there is no doubt that Skanderbeg had already achieved a reputation as a hero in his own time. The failure of most European nations, with the exception of Naples, to give him support, along with the failure of Pope Pius II's plans to organize a promised crusade against the Ottomans meant that none of Skanderbeg's victories permanently hindered the Ottomans from invading the Western Balkans.

Skanderbeg's main legacy was the inspiration he gave to all of those who saw in him a symbol of the struggle of Christendom against the Ottoman Empire. Skanderbeg's struggle against the Ottomans became highly significant to the Albanian people. Among the Arberesh (Italo-Albanians) the memory of Skanderbeg and his exploits was maintained and survived through songs, in the form of a Skanderbeg cycle. During the Albanian National Awakening, Skanderbeg also became a central symbol to the emerging Albanian nationalism of late 19th century and a symbol of cultural affinity with Europe. For the Albanians, Skanderbeg symbolised the sacrifice of their people in defending Europe from the Ottomans. It strengthened Albanian solidarity, made them more conscious of their identity, and was a source of inspiration in their struggle for national unity, freedom, and independence. Contemporary Muslim Albanians deemphasize the (Christian) religious heritage of Skanderbeg by viewing him as a defender of the nation and he is promoted as an Albanian symbol of Europe and the West.

The trouble Skanderbeg gave the Ottoman Empire's military forces was such that when the Ottomans found the grave of Skanderbeg in the St. Nicholas church in Lezhë, they opened it and made amulets of his bones, believing that these would confer bravery on the wearer. Indeed, the damage inflicted on the Ottoman Army was such that Skanderbeg is said to have slain three thousand Ottomans with his own hand during his campaigns. Among stories told about him was that he never slept more than five hours at night and could cut two men asunder with a single stroke of his scimitar, cut through iron helmets, kill a wild boar with a single stroke, and cleave the head of a buffalo with another. In the 18th century, James Wolfe, commander of the British forces at Quebec, spoke of Skanderbeg as a commander who "excels all the officers, ancient and modern, in the conduct of a small defensive army". On 27 October 2005, the United States Congress issued a resolution "honoring the 600th anniversary of the birth of Gjergj Kastrioti (Scanderbeg), statesman, diplomat, and military genius, for his role in saving Western Europe from Ottoman occupation." Fully understanding the importance of the hero to the Albanians, Nazi Germany formed the 21st Waffen Mountain Division of the SS Skanderbeg (1st Albanian) in 1944, composed of 6,491 Kosovo Albanian recruits.

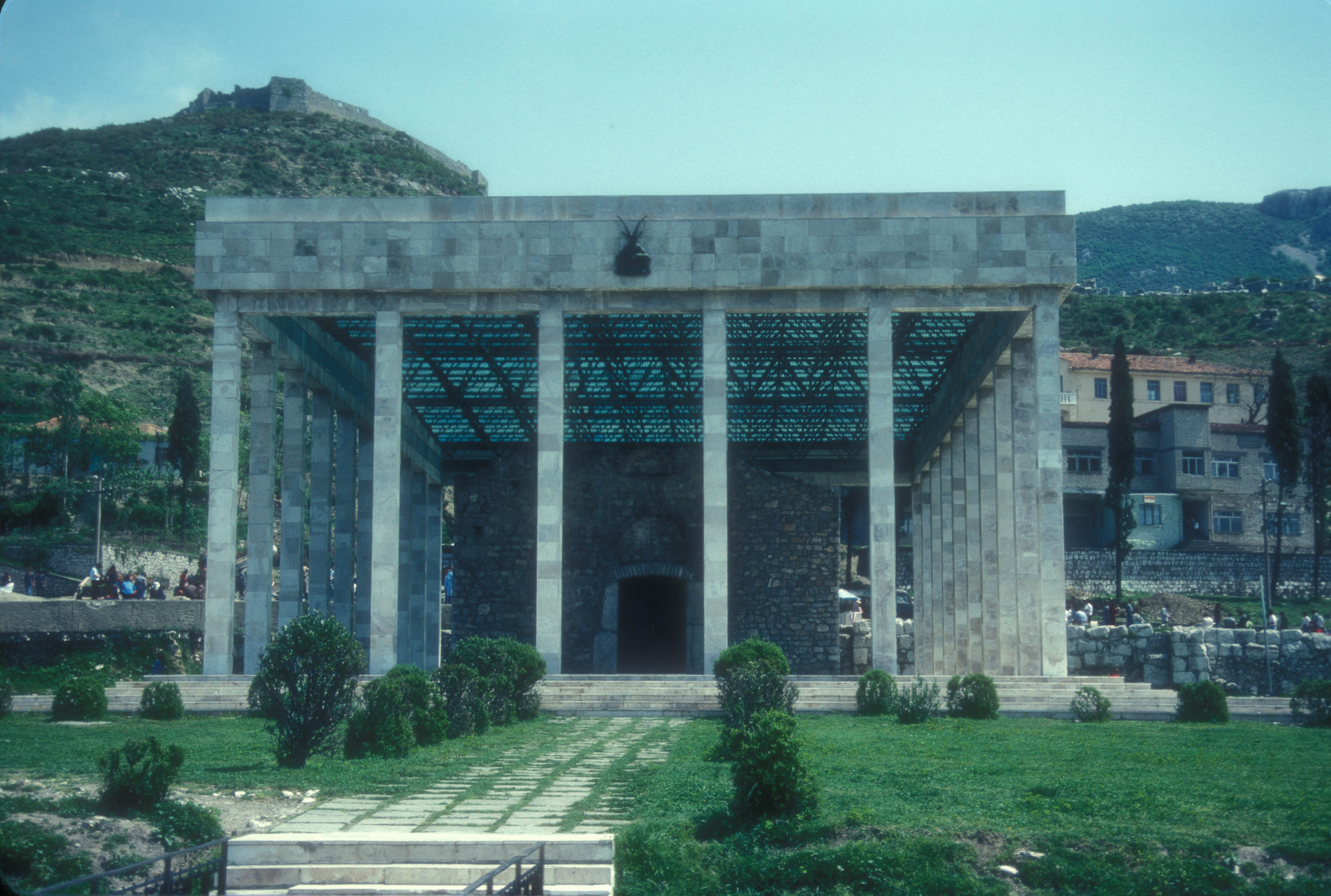
Skanderbeg's mausoleum (former Selimie Mosque and St. Nicolas' Church) in Lezhë

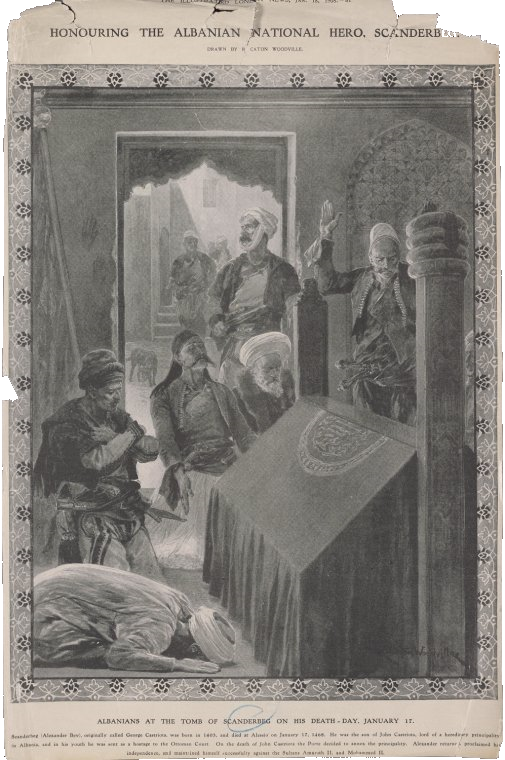
Honoring the Albanian National Hero, Scanderbeg. Albanians at the Tomb of Scanderbeg on His Death Day. Drawn by R. Caton Woodville, 17 January 1908.

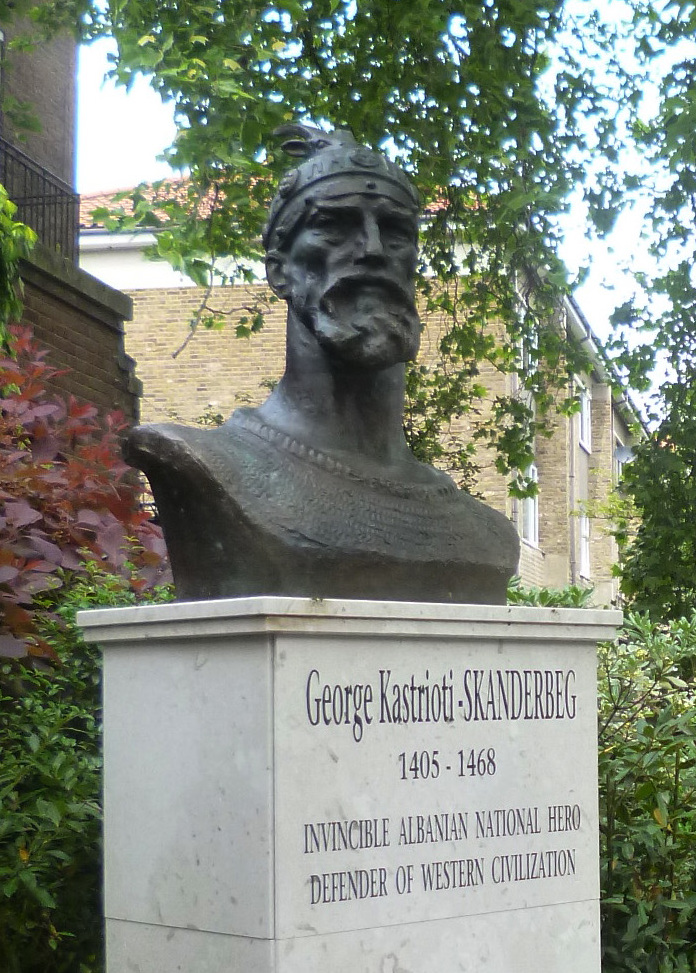
A bust of Skanderbeg on Inverness Terrace, Bayswater, London where there is a sizeable Albanian community. The bust was unveiled in 2012 on the 100th anniversary of Albanian independence.

== In literature and art ==
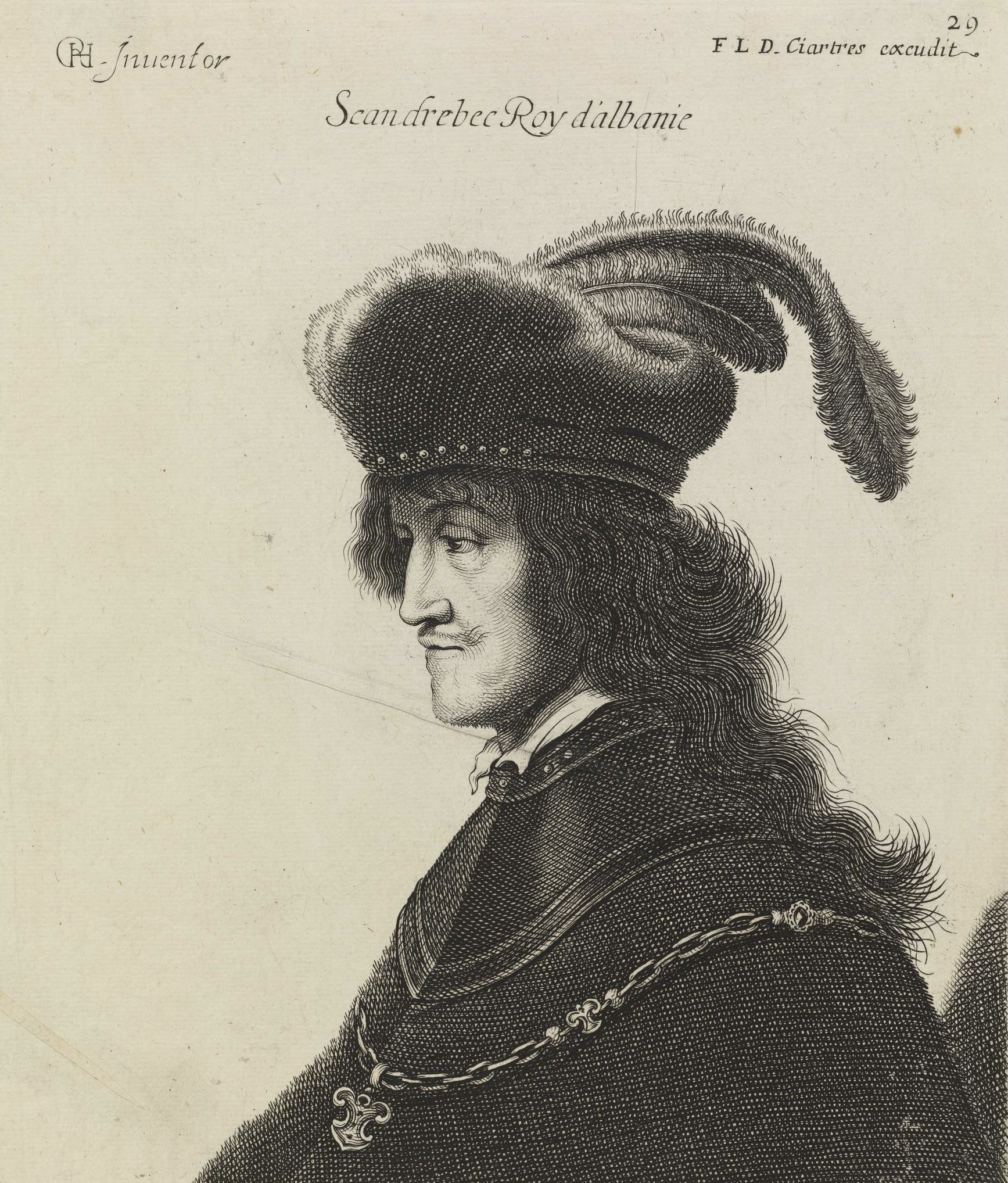
Sketch portrait of Skanderbeg by Rembrandt (1625–1647)

There are two known works of literature written about Skanderbeg which were produced in the 15th century. The first was written at the beginning of 1480 by Serbian writer Martin Segon who was the Catholic Bishop of Ulcinj and one of the most notable 15th-century humanists, a short but very important biographical sketch on Skanderbeg (Italian: Narrazioni di Giorgio Castriotto, da i Turchi nella lingua loro chiamato Scander beg, cioe Alesandro Magno). Another 15th-century literary work with Skanderbeg as one of the main characters was Memoirs of a Janissary (Serbian: Успомене јаничара) written in the period of 1490–97 by Konstantin Mihailović, a Serb who was a janissary in the Ottoman Army.

Skanderbeg gathered quite a posthumous reputation in Western Europe. In the 16th and 17th centuries, most of the Balkans were under the suzerainty of the Ottomans who were at the gates of Vienna in 1683 and narratives of the heroic Christian's resistance to the "Moslem hordes" captivated readers' attention in the West. Books on the Albanian prince began to appear in Western Europe in the early 16th century. One of the earliest was the History of the life and deeds of Scanderbeg, Prince of the Epirotes (Latin: Historia de vita et gestis Scanderbegi, Epirotarum Principis; Rome, 1508), published a mere four decades after Skanderbeg's death, written by Albanian-Venetian historian Marinus Barletius, who, after experiencing the Ottoman capture of his native Scutari firsthand, settled in Padua where he became rector of the parish church of St. Stephan. Barleti dedicated his work to Don Ferrante Kastrioti, Skanderbeg's grandchild, and to posterity. The book was first published in Latin and was translated into many languages including English in 1596. Barleti is sometimes inaccurate in favour of his hero, for example, according to Gibbon, Barleti claims that the Sultan was killed by disease under the walls of Krujë. He made up spurious correspondence between Vladislav II of Wallachia and Skanderbeg wrongly assigning it to the year 1443 instead of to the year 1444, and also invented correspondence between Skanderbeg and Sultan Mehmed II to match his interpretations of events.

Franciscus Blancus, a Catholic bishop born in Albania, also wrote Scanderbegs's biography, Georgius Castriotus, Epirensis vulgo Scanderbegh, Epirotarum Princeps Fortissimus published in Latin in 1636. French philosopher Voltaire held the Albanian hero in very high consideration in his works. Sir William Temple considered Skanderbeg to be one of the seven greatest chiefs without a crown, along with Belisarius, Flavius Aetius, John Hunyadi, Gonzalo Fernández de Córdoba, Alexander Farnese, and William the Silent. Ludvig Holberg, a Danish writer and philosopher, claimed that Skanderbeg was one of the greatest generals in history.

The Italian baroque composer Antonio Vivaldi composed an opera entitled Scanderbeg (first performed 1718), libretto written by Antonio Salvi. Another opera, entitled Scanderberg, was composed by 18th-century French composer François Francœur (first performed in 1735). In the 20th century, Albanian composer Prenkë Jakova composed a third opera, entitled Gjergj Kastrioti Skënderbeu, which premiered in 1968 for the 500th anniversary of the hero's death.

Skanderbeg is the protagonist of three 18th-century British tragedies: William Havard's Scanderbeg, A Tragedy (1733), George Lillo's The Christian Hero (1735), and Thomas Whincop's Scanderbeg, Or, Love and Liberty (1747). A number of poets and composers have also drawn inspiration from his military career. The French 16th-century poet Ronsard wrote a poem about him, as did the 19th-century American poet, Henry Wadsworth Longfellow. Gibbon, the 18th-century historian, held Skanderbeg in high regard with panegyric expressions.

Giammaria Biemmi, an Italian priest, published a work on Skanderbeg titled Istoria di Giorgio Castrioto Scanderbeg-Begh in Brescia, Italy in 1742. He claimed that he had found a work published in Venice in 1480 and written by an Albanian humanist from Bar (now in Montenegro), whose brother was a warrior in Skanderbeg's personal guard. According to Biemmi, the work had lost pages dealing with Skanderbeg's youth, the events from 1443 to 1449, the Siege of Krujë (1467), and Skanderbeg's death. Biemmi referred to the author of the work as Antivarino ("the man from Bar"), however, this was Biemmi's invention (a forgery) that some historians (Fan S. Noli and Athanase Gegaj) had not discovered and used as a source in their works.

Skanderbeg is also mentioned by the Prince-Bishop of Montenegro, Petar II Petrović-Njegoš, one of the greatest poets of Serbian literature, in his 1847 epic poem The Mountain Wreath, and in False Tsar Stephen the Little (1851). In 1855, Camille Paganel wrote Histoire de Scanderbeg, inspired by the Crimean War, whereas in the lengthy poetic tale Childe Harold's Pilgrimage (1812–1819), Byron wrote with admiration about Skanderbeg and his warrior nation. Serbian playwright Jovan Sterija Popović wrote and published a play based on Skenderbeg's life in 1828. Poet and president of Matica Srpska Jovan Subotić wrote an epic poem inspired by battles led by Skenderbeg.

The first poetic work on Skanderbeg in the Albanian language was composed by N. Frasheri and published in 1898.

The Great Warrior Skanderbeg (Albanian: Skënderbeu, Russian: Великий воин Албании Скандербег), a 1953 Albanian-Soviet biographical film, earned an International Prize at the 1954 Cannes Film Festival. The film was re-recorded and updated for high-definition for the 100th anniversary of Albanian independence.

Skanderbeg's memory has been engraved in many museums, such as the Skanderbeg Museum next to Krujë Castle. Many monuments are dedicated to his memory in the Albanian cities of Tirana (in Skanderbeg Square by Odhise Paskali),(in and outside Skanderbeg Museum by Janaq Paço) Krujë, and Peshkopi. A palace in Rome in which Skanderbeg resided during his 1466–67 visits to the Vatican is still called Palazzo Skanderbeg and currently houses the Italian museum of pasta: the palace is located in Piazza Scanderbeg, between the Fontana di Trevi and the Quirinal Palace. Also in Rome, a statue by florentine sculptor Romano Romanelli is dedicated to the Albanian hero in Piazza Albania. Monuments or statues of Skanderbeg have also been erected in the cities of Skopje and Debar, in North Macedonia; Pristina, in Kosovo; Geneva, in Switzerland; Brussels, in Belgium; London, in England; and other settlements in southern Italy where there is an Arbëreshë community. In 2006, a statue of Skanderbeg was unveiled on the grounds of St. Paul's Albanian Catholic Church in Rochester Hills, Michigan. It is the first statue of Skanderbeg to be erected in the United States.

His name is also commemorated in Skanderbeg Military University in Tirana; Skënderbeu Stadium, home of KF Skënderbeu Korçë; and the Order of Skanderbeg.

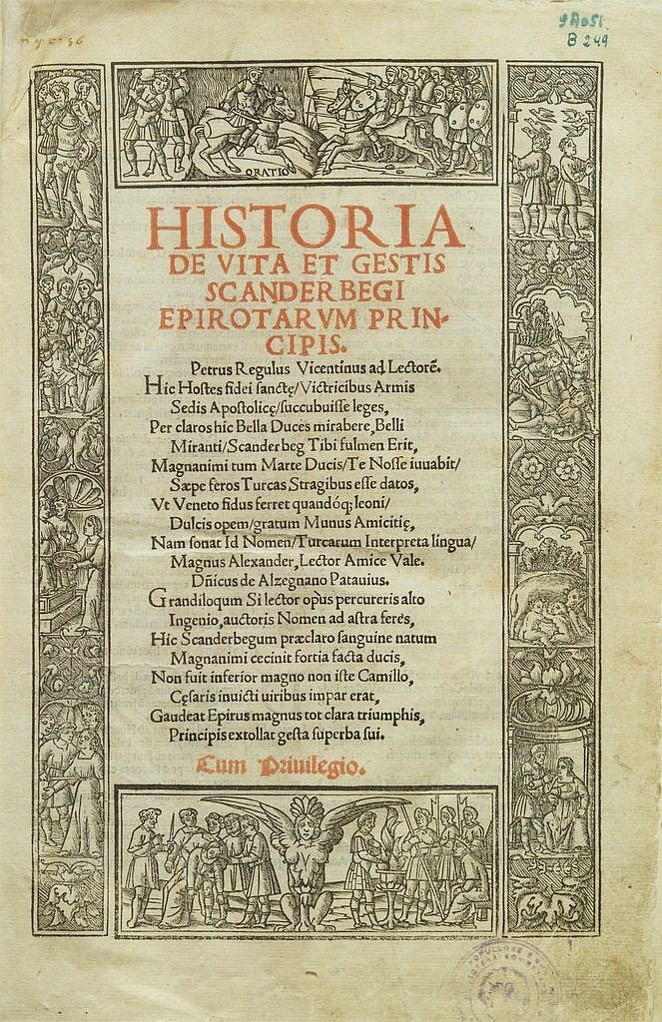
Historia de vita et gestis Scanderbegi, Epirotarum principis by Marin Barleti

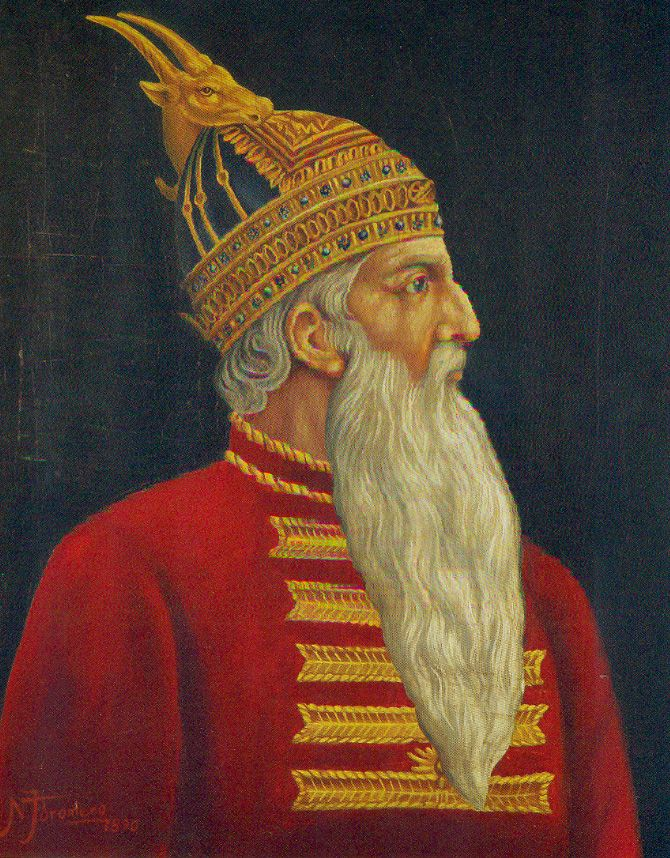
Portrait of George Castriota Skanderbeg, by Kolë Idromeno (1890)

Flag of Skanderbeg by Hieronymus Henninges (1598)

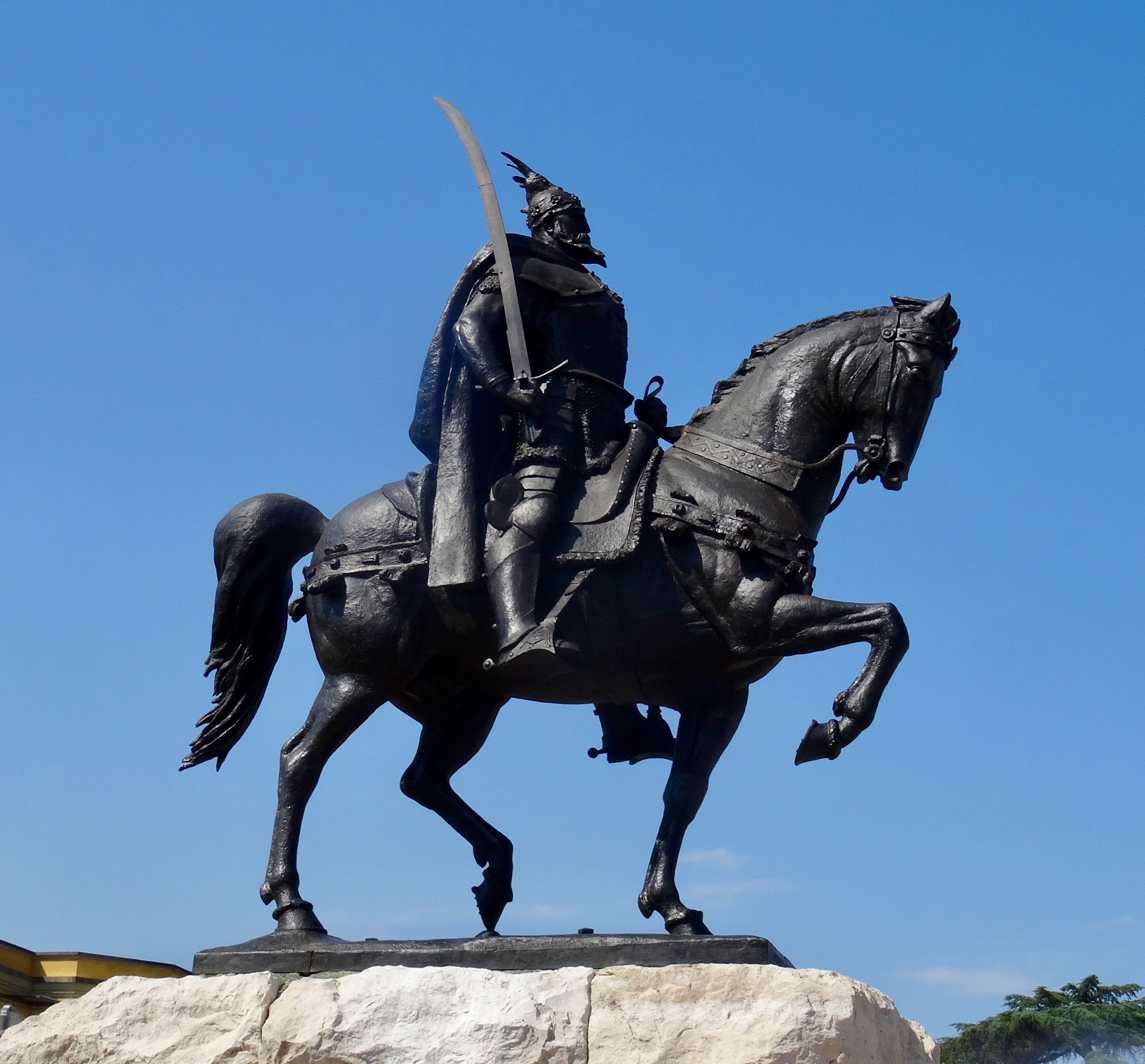
Skanderbeg monument in Tirana's main square, in Albanian called as Sheshi Skënderbej

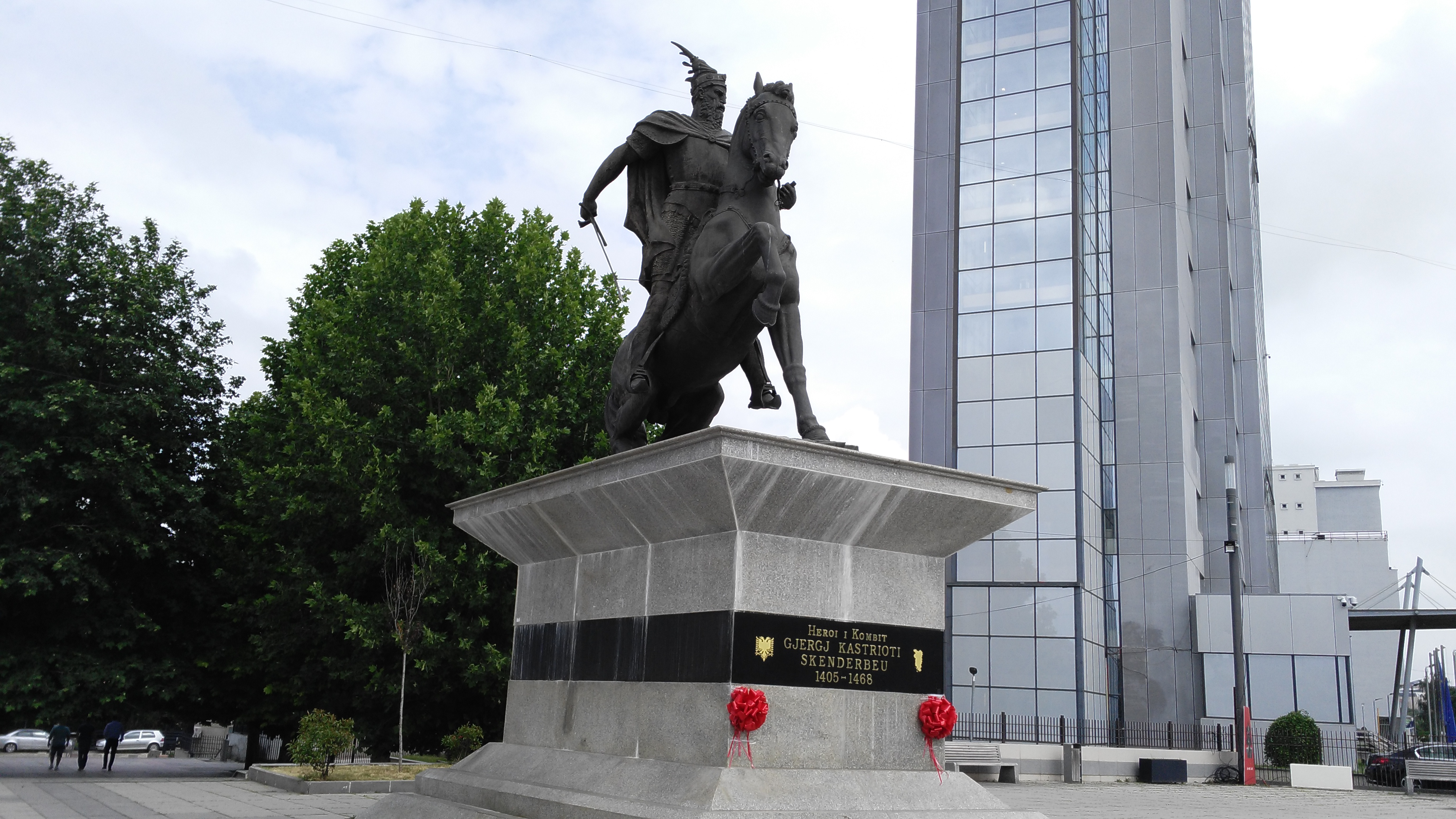
Skanderbeg square, in the center of Pristina, in Kosovo called as Sheshi "Skënderbeu". A statue of Skanderbeg stands in the center of the square

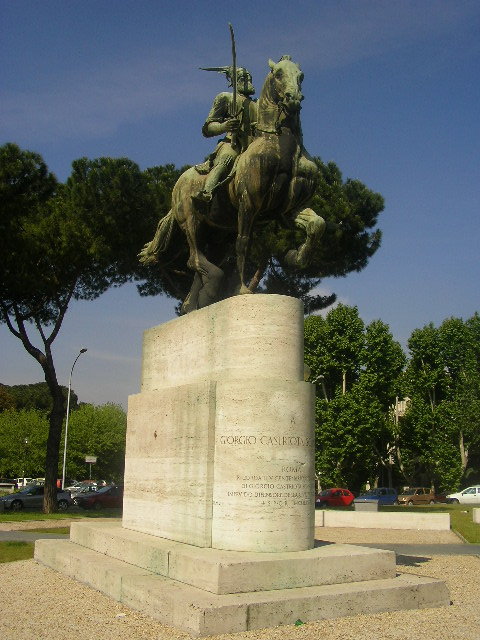
A statue of Skanderbeg in a square in Rome

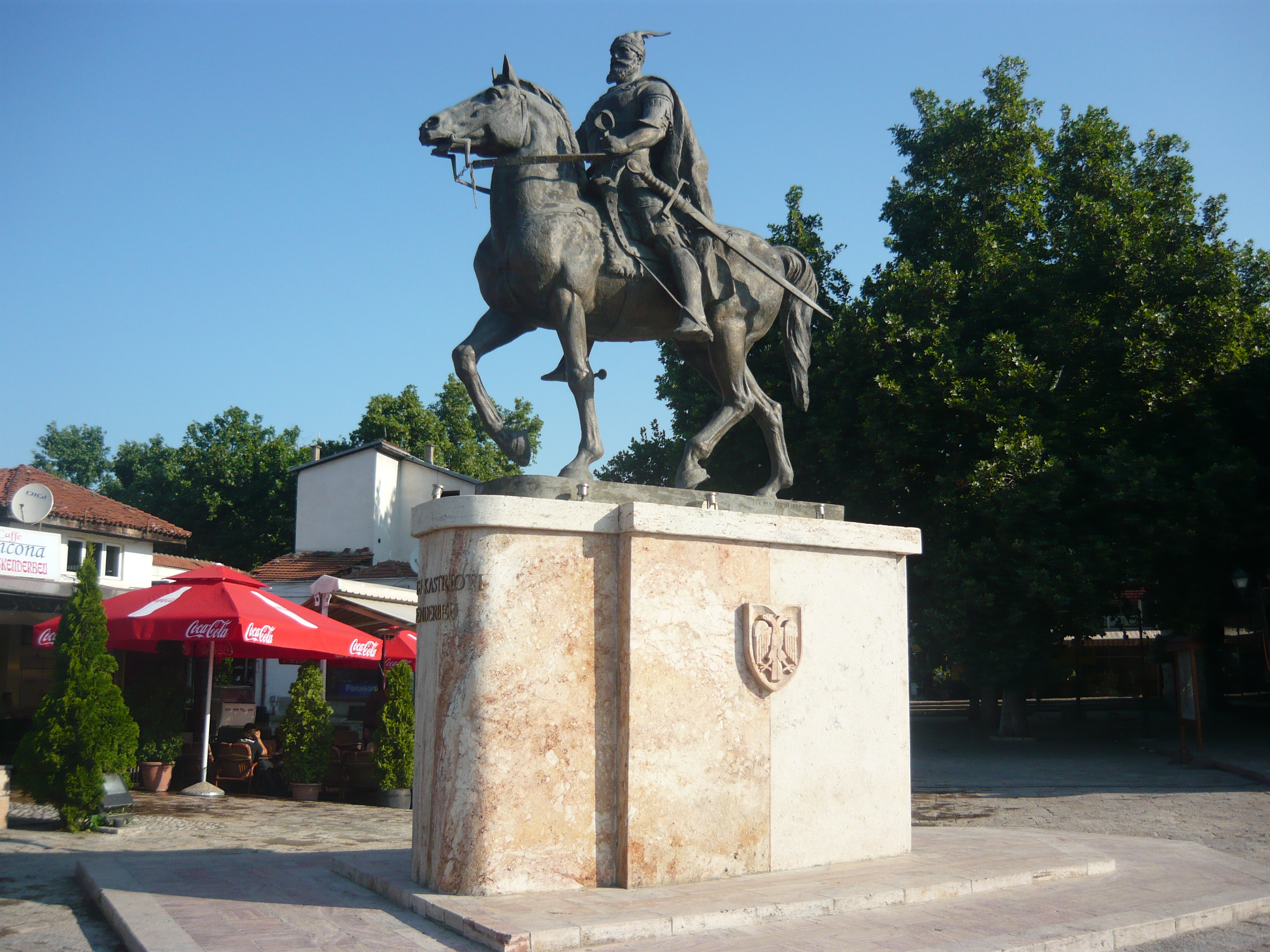
A statue of Skanderbeg in the square with the same name in Skopje (2001)

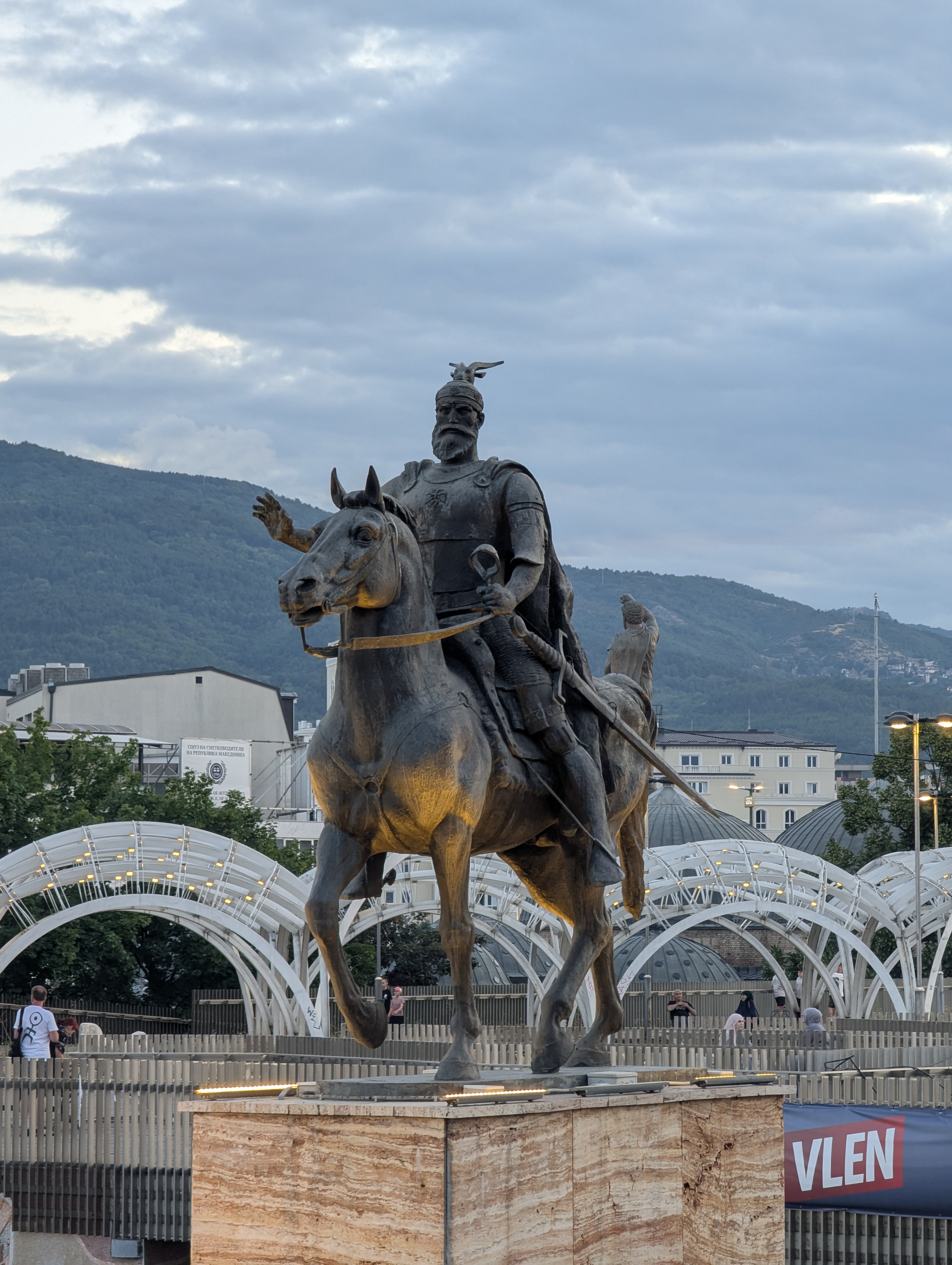
The same statue of Skanderbeg repositioned on a taller pedestal (2025)

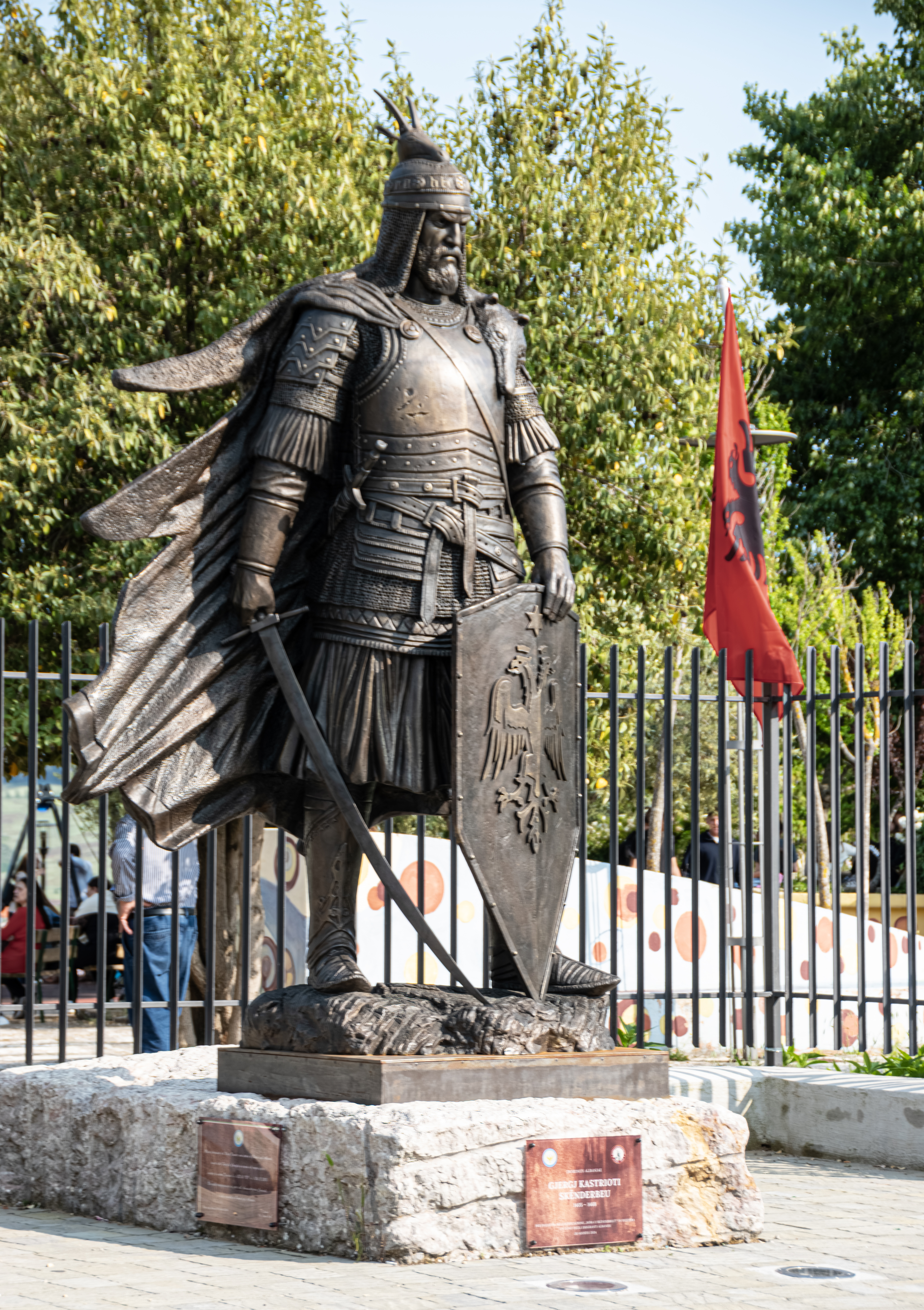
Statue of Skanderbeg in Piana degli Albanesi, Sicily

== See also ==
- Arms of Skanderbeg
- Myth of Skanderbeg
- Palazzo Skanderbeg in Piazza Scanderbeg
- Timeline of Skanderbeg
- Year of Skanderbeg
- Order of Skanderbeg

== General and cited sources ==
- Ajeti, Idriz (1969). Simpoziumi per Skenderbeun. Instituti Albanologjik.
- Anamali, Skënder (2002), Historia e popullit shqiptar në katër vëllime (in Albanian), vol. I, Botimet Toena, OCLC 52411919
- Babinger, Franz (1992), Mehmed the Conqueror and His Time, Princeton University Press, ISBN 978-0-691-01078-6
- Bela, Muhamet (2019). "A ishte Skënderbeu nga Hasi?! - Mendime rreth origjinës së Skënderbeut". In Syla, Sabit; Verli, Marenglen; Asani, Skënder; Berisha, Gjon (eds.). Gjergj Kastrioti - Skënderbeu në 550-vjetorin e vdekjes: (materiale nga Konferenca shkencore ndërkombëtare "Gjergj Kastrioti - Skënderbeu në 550-vjetorin e vdekjes", mbajtur në Prishtinë, më 16 tetor 2018) (PDF) (in Albanian). Institute of history "Ali Hadri". ISBN 978-9951409803.
- Biçoku, Kasëm (2007). "Peshkopata e Arbnit dhe Kastriotët [The bishopric of Arbni and the Kastriots]". Studime Historike. 03–04.
- Božić, Ivan (1979), Nemirno pomorje XV veka (in Serbian), Beograd: Srpska književna zadruga, OCLC 5845972
- Cohen, Richard (2003), By the Sword: A History of Gladiators, Musketeers, Samurai, Swashbucklers, and Olympic Champions, Random House, Inc., ISBN 978-0-8129-6966-5
- Demiraj, Bardhyl, ed. (2008). Fjalor latinisht-epirotisht, 1635 (Botim kritik nga Bardhyl Demiraj). Botime Françeskane.
- Drizari, Nelo (1968), Scanderbeg; his life, correspondence, orations, victories, and philosophy, National Press, OCLC 729093
- Elsie, Robert (2010b). Historical Dictionary of Kosovo. Lanham, Maryland: Rowman & Littlefield. ISBN 978-0-8108-7483-1.
- Elsie, Robert (2000). A dictionary of Albanian religion, mythology, and folk culture. New York University Press. ISBN 0-8147-2214-8.
- Elsie, Robert (2010a) [2004], Historical Dictionary Of Albania (PDF), Maryland: Rowman & Littlefield Publishing Group, ISBN 978-1-282-52192-6, OCLC 816372706, archived from the original (PDF) on 6 October 2014
- Endresen, Cecilie (2015). "The Nation and the Nun: Mother Teresa, Albania's Muslim Majority and the Secular State". Islam and Christian Muslim Relations. 26 (1): 53–74. doi:10.1080/09596410.2014.961765. S2CID 143946229.
- Fine, John Van Antwerp (1994), The Late Medieval Balkans: A Critical Survey from the Late Twelfth Century to the Ottoman Conquest, University of Michigan Press, ISBN 978-0-472-08260-5
- Francione, Gennaro (2003), Skenderbeu: Një hero modern (in Albanian), Shtëpia botuese "Naim Frashëri", ISBN 978-99927-38-75-7
- Franco, Demetrio (1480). Comentario de le cose de' Turchi, et del S. Georgio Scanderbeg, principe d' Epyr. Venice: Altobello Salkato. ISBN 99943-1-042-9.
- Franco, Demetrio (1539). Comentario de le cose de' Turchi, et del S. Georgio Scanderbeg, principe d'Epyr. Altobello Salkato. ISBN 978-99943-1-042-5.
- Frashëri, Kristo (1964), The history of Albania: a brief survey, s.n., OCLC 1738885
- Frashëri, Kristo (2002), Gjergj Kastrioti Skënderbeu: jeta dhe vepra, 1405–1468 (in Albanian), Botimet Toena, ISBN 99927-1-627-4
- Gegaj, Athanase (1937), L'Albanie et l'Invasion turque au XVe siècle (in French), Universite de Louvain, ISBN 978-0598935991, OCLC 652265147
- Gibbon, Edward (1901) [1802], The decline and fall of the Roman empire, P. F. Collier & Son, OCLC 317326240
- Glassé, Cyril (2008), The new encyclopedia of Islam, Rowman & Littlefield, ISBN 978-0-7425-6296-7
- Hasluck, Margaret (2015). The Unwritten Law in Albania. Cambridge University Press. ISBN 978-1107586932.
- Hodgkinson, Harry (1999), Scanderbeg, Centre for Albanian Studies, ISBN 978-1-873928-13-4
- Hodgkinson, Harry (2005), Scanderbeg: From Ottoman Captive to Albanian Hero, I.B. Tauris, ISBN 1-85043-941-9
- Housley, Norman (1992), The later Crusades, 1274–1580: from Lyons to Alcazar, Oxford University Press, ISBN 978-0-19-822136-4
- İnalcık, Halil (1995), From empire to republic: essays on Ottoman and Turkish social history, Istanbul: Isis Press, ISBN 978-975-428-080-7
- Jorga, Neculai (1908–1913), Geschichte Des Osmanischen Reiches. Nach Den Quellen Dargestellt (in German), vol. II, OCLC 560022388
- Lane–Poole, Stanley (1888), The story of Turkey, G.P. Putnam's sons, OCLC 398296
- Longfellow, Henry Wadsworth (1880), Tales of a wayside inn, Houghton, Mifflin and Co., p. 286, OCLC 562689407
- Malaj, Edmond (2013). "Familje fisnike të Drishtit mesjetar (Noble Families of Medieval Drivasto". Studime Historike. 3–4.
- Marinesco, Constantin (1923), "Alphonse V, roi d'Aragon et de Naples et l'Albanie de Scanderbeg", Mélanges de l'École roumaine en France (in French), I, OCLC 459949498
- Marković, Savo (2004). "Benediktinska opatija svete Marije Ratačke kod Bara, Acta diplomatica et iuridica". Croatica Christiana Periodica. 28 (53).
- Myhill, John (2006). Language, religion and national identity in Europe and the Middle East: A historical study. Amsterdam: John Benjamins Publishing. ISBN 978-9027227119.
- Myrdal, Jan (1976), Albania defiant, Monthly Review Press, ISBN 978-0-85345-356-7
- Nasse, George Nicholas (1964), The Italo-Albanian villages of southern Italy, National Academies, ISBN 978-0598204004, OCLC 476226177
- Ndreca, Arben (2019). "A handful of documents about Gjon and Gjergj Castriot in Old Slavic (Part two) [Disa dokumente rreth Gjon dhe Gjergj Kastriotit në sllavishten e vjetër (Pjesa II)]". Shejzat – Pleiades. 1–2.
- Noli, Fan S. (1947), George Castrioti Scanderbeg (1405–1468), New York: International Universities Press, OCLC 732882
- Omari, Jeton (2014). Scanderbeg tra storia e storiografia [Skanderbeg between history and historiography] (PDF) (Thesis). University of Padua.
- Paganel, Camille (1855), Histoire de Scanderbeg, ou Turks et chrétiens au xve siècle (in French), Paris: Didier, OCLC 562582673
- Ramet, Sabrina (1998). Nihil obstat: religion, politics, and social change in East-Central Europe and Russia. Durham: Duke University Press. ISBN 978-0822320708.
- Rosser, John Hutchins (2001), Historical dictionary of Byzantium, Scarecrow Press, ISBN 978-0-8108-3979-3
- Runciman, Steven (1990), The fall of Constantinople, 1453, Cambridge University Press, ISBN 978-0-521-39832-9
- Schmitt, Oliver Jens (2001), Das venezianische Albanien (1392–1479) (in German), München: R. Oldenbourg Verlag GmbH München, ISBN 3-486-56569-9
- Schmitt, Oliver Jens. "Die venezianischen Jahrbücher des Stefano Magno (ÖNB Codd 6215–6217) als Quelle zur albanischen und epirotischen Geschichte im späten Mittelalter (1433–1477)". In Schmitt & Clewing (2005).
- Schmitt, Oliver Jens; Clewing, Konrad, eds. (2005). Südosteuropa : von vormoderner Vielfalt und nationalstaatlicher Vereinheitlichung: Festschrift für Edgar Hösch (in German). Oldenbourg Verlag. ISBN 978-3-486-57888-1. OCLC 62309552.
- Sedlar, Jean W. (1994), East Central Europe in the Middle Ages, 1000–1500, University of Washington Press, ISBN 978-0-295-97290-9
- Setton, Kenneth Meyer (1975), Hazard, H. W. (ed.), A History of the Crusades: The fourteenth and fifteenth centuries, vol. III, Univ of Wisconsin Press, ISBN 978-0-299-06670-3
- Setton, Kenneth M. (1976), The papacy and the Levant, 1204–1571: The thirteenth and fourteenth centuries, American Philosophical Society, ISBN 978-0-87169-127-9
- Setton, Kenneth M. (1978), The Papacy and the Levant, 1204–1571: The fifteenth century, vol. II, American Philosophical Society, ISBN 978-0-87169-127-9
- Stavrianos, Leften Stavros (1958), The Balkans since 1453, Rinehart, ISBN 978-0030096853, OCLC 485496689
- Stavrides, Theoharis (2001), The Sultan of vezirs : the life and times of the Ottoman Grand Vezir Mahmud Pasha Angelovic (1453–1474), Leiden: Brill, ISBN 978-90-04-12106-5, OCLC 46640850
- Temple, William (1705), Miscellanea: The first part. Containing I. A survey of the constitutions and interests of the Empire, Sweden, ... IV An essay upon the cure of the gout by Moxa., printed for Jacob Tonson, and Awnsham and John Churchill, OCLC 83414679
- Volaterranus, Raffaele Maffei (1603), Commentariorum Urbanorum, Apud Claudius Marnium, & haeredes Ioannis Aubrii
- Willson, Beckles (1909), The life and letters of James Wolfe, W. Heinemann, ISBN 978-0-7222-6982-4, OCLC 3890956
- Zilfi, Madeline (2010), Women and Slavery in the Late Ottoman Empire: The Design of Difference, Cambridge University Press, ISBN 978-0-521-51583-2

Skanderbeg Kastrioti family Born: 1405 Died: 1468
Political offices
Preceded by Hizir Bey	[Ottoman] subaşi of Krujë; 1437 – November 1438	Succeeded by Hizir Bey
Unknown	[Ottoman sanjakbey] of the Sanjak of Dibra; 1440 – November 1443	Unknown
Regnal titles
Preceded by Post created	Lord of Albania (or Krujë); 1450 – 17 January 1468	Succeeded by Post abolished
Military offices
Preceded by Post created	Head of League of Lezhë; 2 March 1444 – c. 1450	Succeeded by Post abolished
