= Trevi (rione of Rome) =

- Rione of Rome
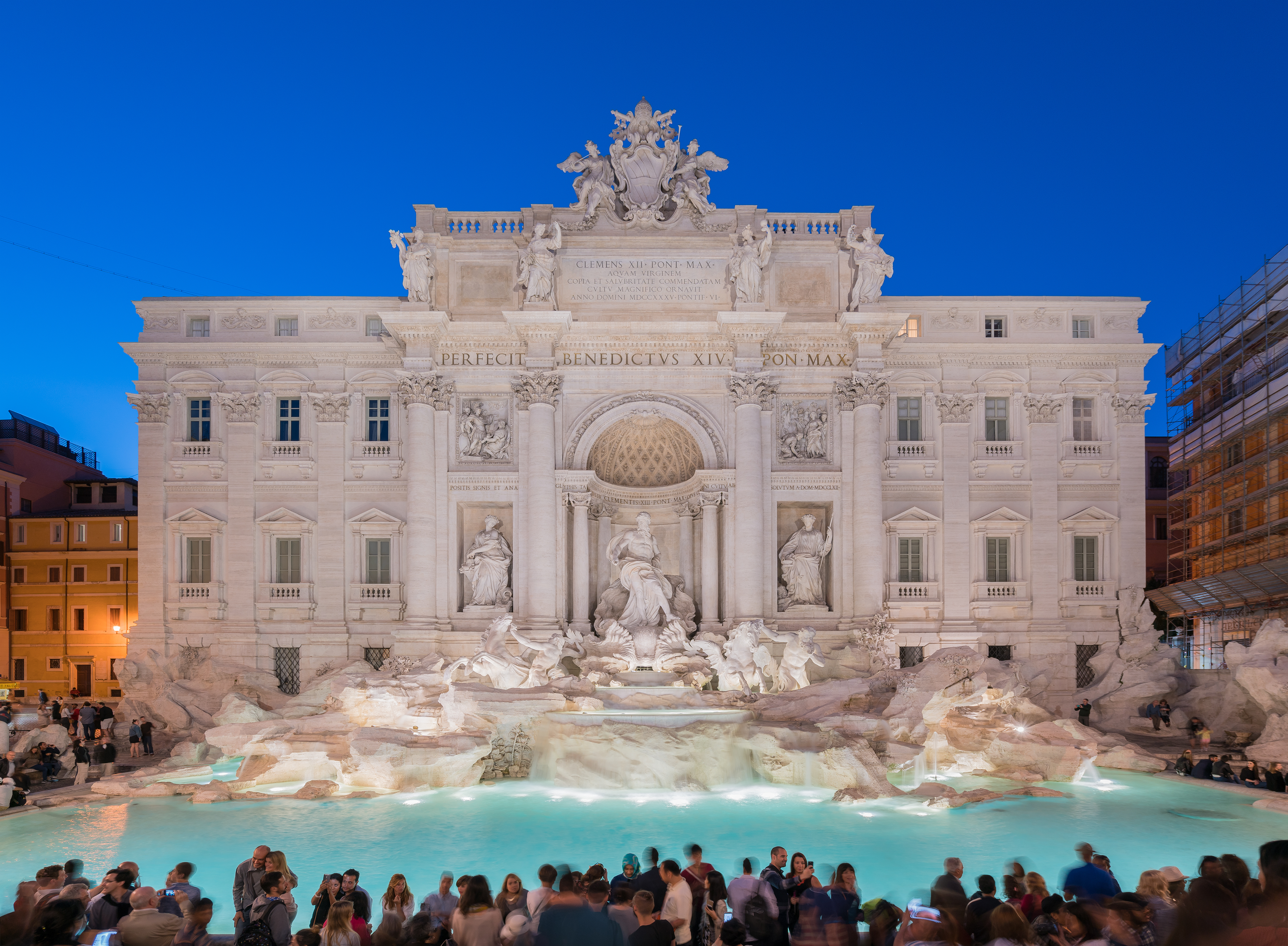
- Trevi Fountain: the most famous monument in the area

- Seal

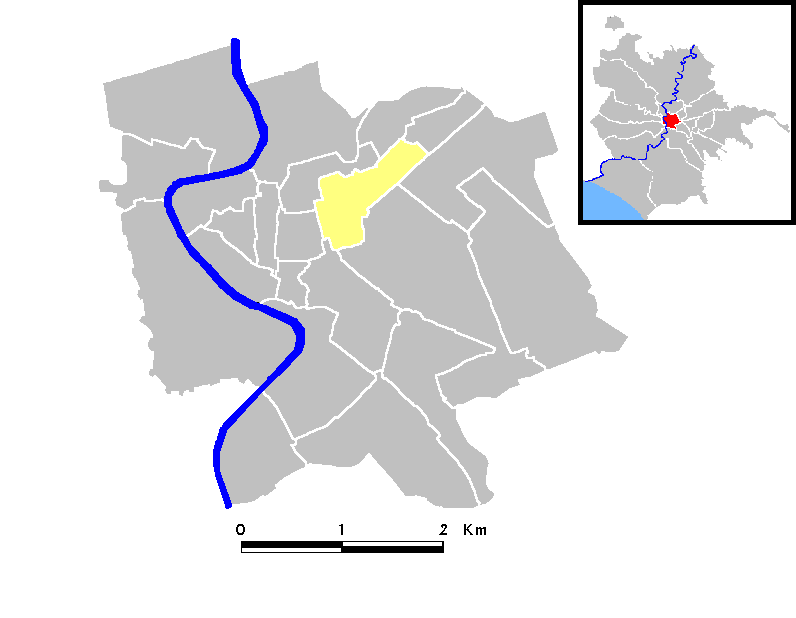
- Position of the rione within the center of the city
- Country: Italy
- Region: Lazio
- Province: Rome
- Comune: Rome
- Time zone: UTC+1 (CET)
  - Summer (DST): UTC+2 (CEST)

Trevi is the 2nd rione of Rome, Italy, identified by the initials R. II, located in Municipio I. The origin of its name is not clear, but the most accepted theory is that it comes from the Latin trivium (meaning 'three streets'), because there were three streets all leading to the current Piazza dei Crociferi, a square next to the modern Trevi square. Its coat of arms is made of three swords on a red background.

== History ==
This rione, during the Roman Republic belonged to the third region, while during the Roman Empire was split up into two regions: the VI, called Alta Semita and the VII, called via Lata.

During the ancient Roman period, in rione Trevi there were large groups of private houses with some monumental buildings. Since that time the area was actually split up into two parts: a lower one, level and next to the river Tiber, and a higher one on the hills. The first one was one of the center of the activities of the city, while the second one was a rich and peaceful residential area.

After the fall of the Roman Empire, a lot of people moved away from the hills to settle next to the river, in the lower part. The urbanization followed the people: next to the river Tiber the rione was full of buildings while almost nothing was built again on the hills until the Renaissance.

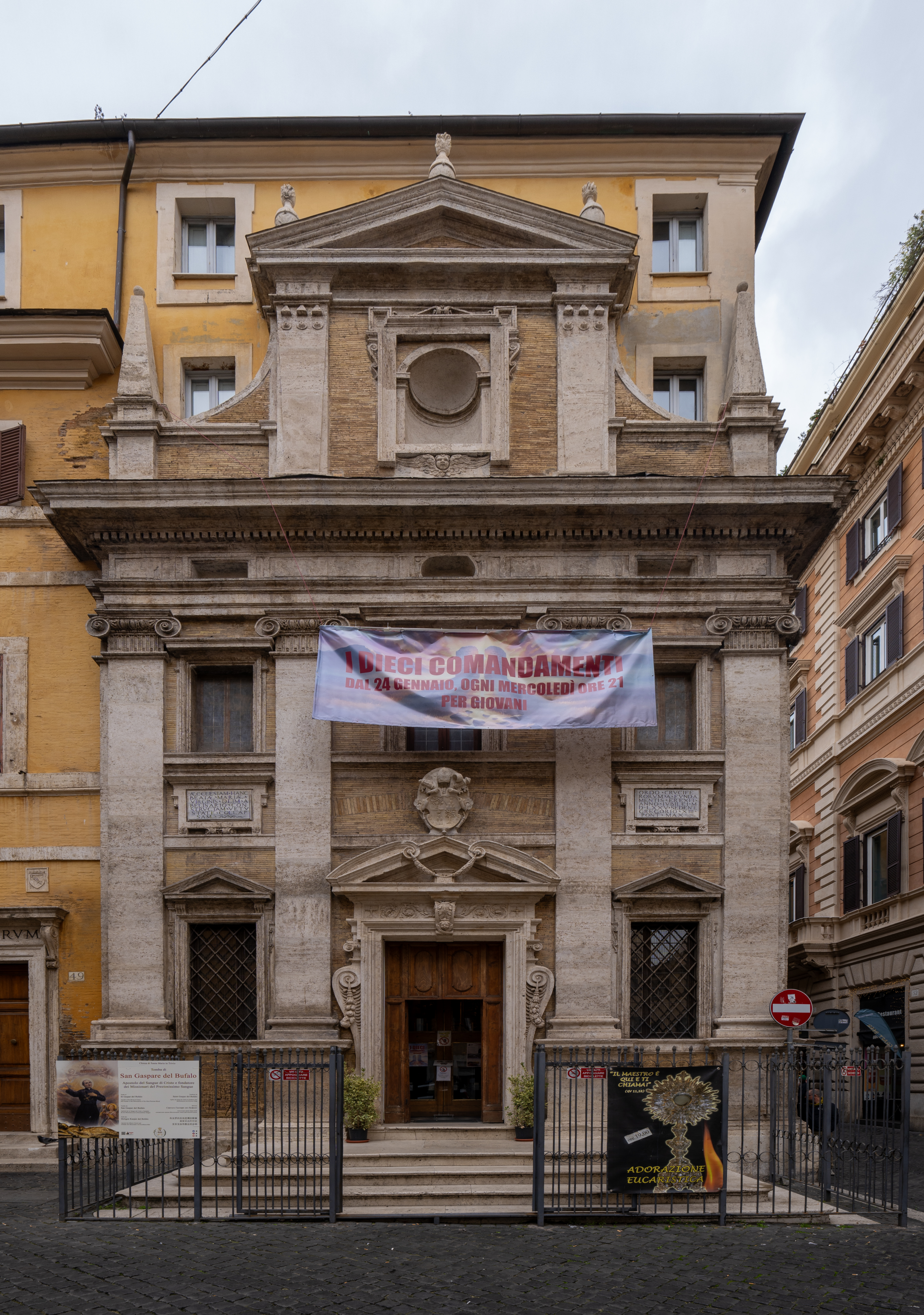
Piazza dei Crociferi, with the Church of Santa Maria in Trivio

In 1600 urbanization, new streets, churches and fountains caused the rione Trevi to be quite crowded, and it did not change significantly until the end of the 19th century. The Quirinal Hill, partially isolated from the crowded part close to the river, was slowly becoming a center of power thanks to numerous buildings belonging to the Pope.

Under the domination of Napoleon, in 1811, the Quirinal Hill was selected to be the center of the imperial power in Rome. The plan was not completed because of the fall of Napoleon, but the idea remained and was partially achieved after Rome became capital of Italy, after the 1870. In fact nowadays several ministries are placed in the rione Trevi.

This changed completely the appearance of the higher part of the rione, that was not very crowded but full of small streets, churches and monumental buildings.

The most famous monument in the rione is Trevi Fountain.

== Geography ==
=== Boundaries ===
Northward, Trevi borders with Colonna (R. III), whose boundary is marked by a brief stretch of Via del Corso and by Via delle Muratte, Via di Santa Maria in Via, Largo San Claudio, Via del Pozzetto, Via del Bufalo, Largo del Nazareno, Via del Nazareno, Via del Tritone and Piazza Barberini. It also borders with Ludovisi (R. XVI), through Via di San Basilio.

Eastward, the rione borders with Sallustiano (R. XVII), from which is separated by Via Leonida Bissolati, Via Giosuè Carducci, Via di Santa Susanna and Largo di Santa Susanna, and with Castro Pretorio (R. XVIII), from which is separated by Piazza San Bernardo and Via XX Settembre.

To the south, the rione borders with Monti (R. I), from which is separated by the Foro Traiano, Via IV Novembre, Largo Magnanapoli, Via XXIV Maggio and Via del Quirinale. Southward, it also shares a short boundary with Campitelli (R. X), which is marked by a portion of Piazza Venezia.

To the west, Trevi borders with Pigna (R. IX), and the boundary is outlined by Piazza Venezia and Via del Corso.

=== Local geography ===
Squares

- Piazza Barberini
- Piazza della Pilotta
- Piazza del Quirinale
- Piazza San Bernardo
- Piazza di San Silvestro
- Piazza Santi Apostoli
- Piazza Scanderbeg
- Piazza di Trevi

Roads

- Via del Corso

== Places of interest ==
=== Palaces and other buildings ===
- Palazzo Baracchini, in Via XX Settembre, built in 19th century by Giulio Podesti, is the seat of the Ministry of Defence
- Palazzo Barberini, in Via delle Quattro Fontane.
- Palazzo del Bufalo alle Fratte, in Largo del Nazareno.
- Palazzo Chigi-Odescalchi, in Piazza dei Santi Apostoli.
- Palazzo Colonna, in Via della Pilotta.
- Palazzo Muti Papazzurri, in Piazza della Pilotta.
- Palazzo Gentili del Drago, in Via in Arcione.
- Palazzo Guglielmi, in Piazza dei Santi Apostoli.
- Palazzo Mancini, in Via del Corso.
- Palazzo Mengarini, in Via XXIV Maggio.
- Palazzo Poli, in Via Poli.
- Palazzo del Quirinale, in Piazza del Quirinale.
- Palazzo Valentini, in Via IV Novembre.
- Palazzo Scanderbeg, in Piazza Scanderbeg.

=== Churches ===
- San Marcello al Corso
- Oratory of Santissimo Crocifisso
- Oratory of Santissimo Sacramento
- Madonna dell'Archetto
- Basilica dei Santi XII Apostoli
- Santa Maria di Loreto
- Santissimo Nome di Maria al Foro Traiano
- Santa Maria del Carmine alle Tre Cannelle
- Santa Croce e San Bonaventura dei Lucchesi
- Santa Maria dell'Umiltà
- Santa Rita da Cascia alle Vergini
- Santi Vincenzo e Anastasio a Trevi
- Santa Maria in Trivio
- Santa Maria in Via
- Santi Claudio e Andrea dei Borgognoni
- San Basilio agli Orti Sallustiani
- San Nicola da Tolentino
- Santa Susanna alle Terme di Diocleziano
- San Silvestro al Quirinale
- Sant'Andrea degli Scozzesi
- Saint Andrew's Church of Scotland
- Waldensian church in Trevi

=== Fountains ===
- Trevi Fountain
- Fontana del Tritone
- Quattro Fontane

=== Education ===
Public libraries in Trevi include Biblioteca Romana Sarti, that was established in 1881 by the architect Antonio Sarti and Casa delle Traduzioni.
