= Palazzo Muti =

Coordinates: 41.898521°N 12.482733°E

Palazzo Muti e Santuario della Madonna dell' Archetto
- Palazzo Muti
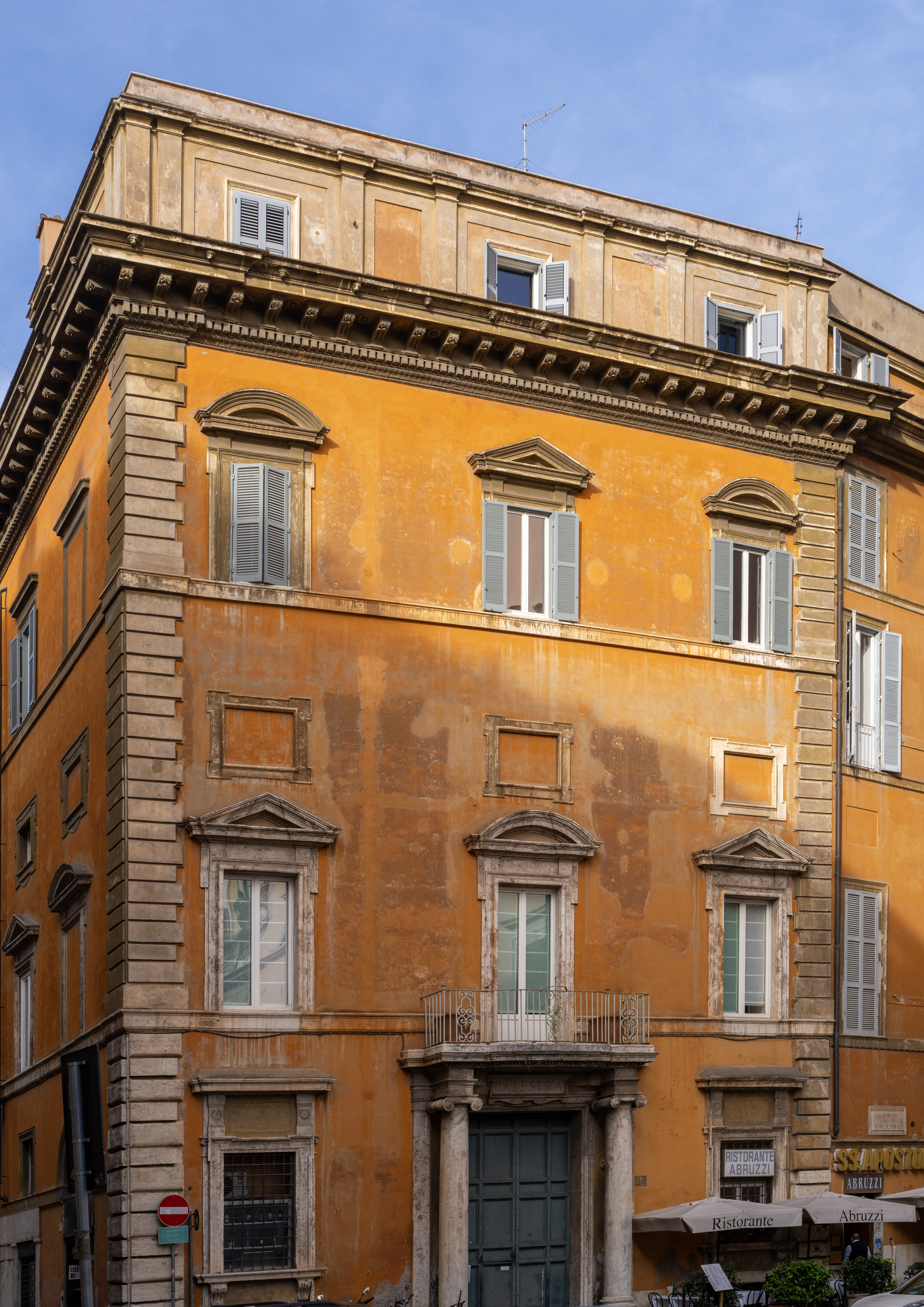
- Palazzo Muti

General information
- Location: Rome, Italy

The Palazzo Muti (officially the Palazzo Muti e Santuario della Madonna dell'Archetto) is a large townhouse in the Piazza dei Santi Apostoli, Rome, Italy, built in 1644. Together with the neighboring Palazzo Muti Papazzurri, it originally formed part of a complex of adjoining palazzi and other houses owned by the Muti Papazzurri family. During the 18th century this entire range of buildings was, by courtesy of the pope, the residence of the House of Stuart government in exile in Rome. They were recognised by the Catholic Church and the Jacobite movement as the rightful kings of Great Britain and Ireland. The Palazzo Muti should not be confused with the Palazzo Muti Papazzurri in the Piazzo della Pilotta which was designed by Mattia de' Rossi in 1660.

== Description ==
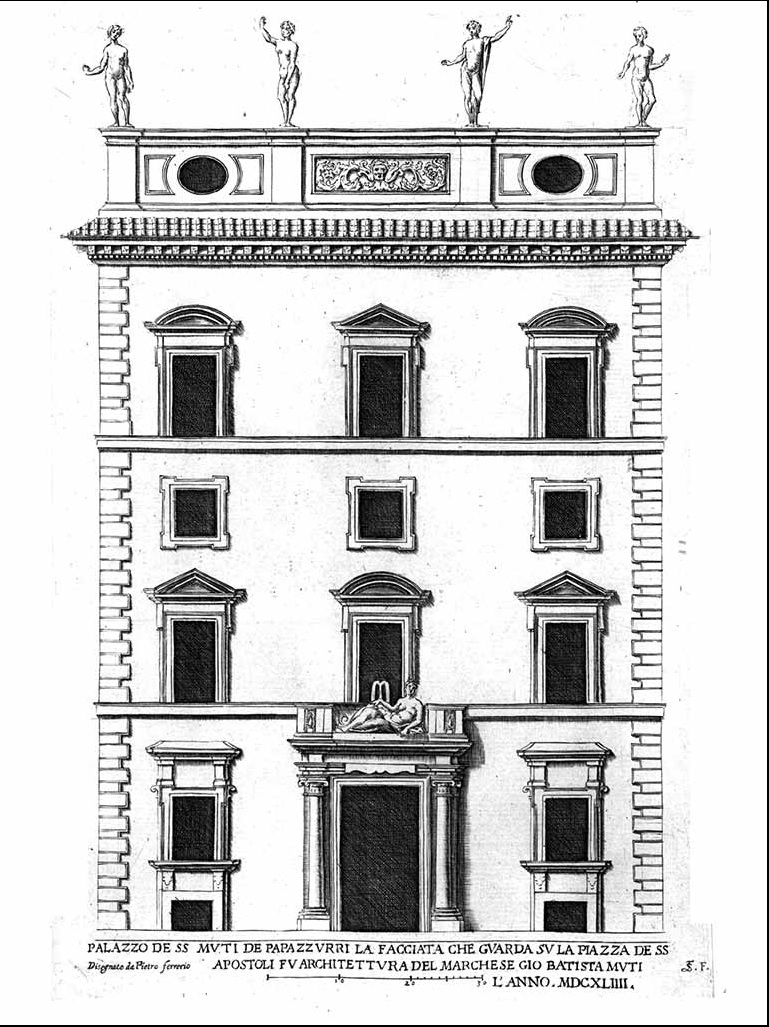
The Palazzo Muti in the 18th century. Today, uppermost floor is altered and the statuary removed.

The Palazzo Muti stands on a street corner, and is constructed on four floors. The architect was Mattia de Rossi who had been commissioned to build a residence for Giovanni Battista Muti Papazzurri, a member of one of Rome's patrician families. The principal facade, today painted ochre and decorated only by quoining is of just three bays, with the main entrance to the palazzo, leading to an inner courtyard, at the centre on the ground floor. The courtyard, as dictated by the narrow rectangular dimensions of the palazzo, is in reality little more than an open lightwell. The entrance itself is flanked by ionic columns, once surmounted by a Baroque pediment, this has since been replaced by a balcony. The architrave of the entrance has engraved upon it the name "Balestra", a family who once owned the palazzo.

The top floor is concealed from sight by a broad cornice. The top floor is architecturally interesting, although hidden from sight at street level its three windows are divided by double pilasters. That such an architectural feature should be hidden insinuates that the whole facade may at one stage in its history been of a more ornate design than is apparent today. An 18th-century drawing of the building (left) shows the top floor was originally lower and decorated in the Baroque style with statuary.

However, even if its severe design the façade betrays some internal secrets, the first floor is obviously a piano nobile, as a hint of the importance of this floor is indicated on the exterior by, not only tall pedimented windows but also above them blind windows indicating the double height of the reception rooms behind them.

The house originally formed part of a complex of family properties which included two other palazzi and two more houses, one of the palazzi was the Palazzo Muti Papazzurri which faces into the Piazza della Pilotta.

== History ==
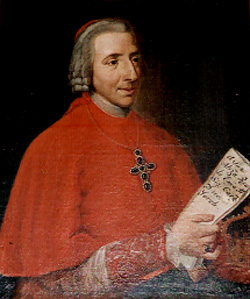
Henry Benedict Stuart, one of the palazzo's residents.

=== Muti Papazzurri family ===
The Muti Papazzurri are documented in Rome from 1435 when the will of Giovanni Paolo Muti mentions a casa complete with a tower on the site, and a painting from the early 17th century shows an older family house, with a large roof terrace, on the site of the present palazzo. In addition to their palazzi in Rome the family also owned a villa in the Province of Viterbo The Muti Papazurri became extinct with the death of Raffaele Muti Papazurri in 1816. The palazzo then passed through female descent into the family of the Marchese Livio Savorelli, who assumed the additional names of Muti Papazzurri. The family name used during the 19th century was "Savorelli Papazzurri", at this time the family also owned the far larger Villa Aurelia on the Janiculum Hill in Rome (used by Garibaldi as his headquarters) which is now the American Academy in Rome.

The south elevation of the Palazzo Muti. With its central doorway, it was probably intended as the principal facade. However, the narrow street makes an architectural appreciation impossible.

The palazzo acquired its long and religious name "Palazzo Muti e Santuario della Madonna dell' Archetto" following an event in 1796 when a sacred image of Madonna in a niche in the narrow alley to the rear of the Palazzo was said to have moved her eyes, another version says she was weeping because the Papal States were being invaded by France. This phenomenon was acknowledged by a papal decree in 1797. Thereafter the statue became known as "Madonna dell'Archetto". The image had been painted circa 1690 by Domenico Muratori for the Marchesa Savorelli Papazzurri who lived at the Palazzo. By 1850 the painting (sometimes called the "Mater Misericordiae" had overcome her distress at the invasion of the Vatican states and was now performing miracles involving divine intervention. The Madonna had become one of the most visited sites of the Virgin Mary in Rome, as a result of this in 1850 the owners of the palazzo Count Alessandro and Countess Caterina Papazzurri Savorelli had the architect Virginio Vespignani build the neoclassical, domed Church of the Madonna dell’Archetto around the shrine. Today this is Rome's smallest functioning church.

The Muti Papazzurri are buried in Rome at the Church of San Marcello al Corso, where their Baroque tombs and memorials still exist.

=== Stuart occupancy ===
Palazzo Muti. Stairs leading from the courtyard to the piano nobile.

The Muti Papazzurri complex of residences was rented in its entirety at the expense of the Pope through the Apostolic Camera from the Marchese Giovanni Battista Muti and his widowed mother the Marchesa Alessandra Millini Muti in 1719 for James Stuart (the "Old Pretender"), and Maria Klementyna Sobieska as their Roman residence. The Popes Clement XI and Innocent XIII considered the couple to be the rightful and, more importantly, Catholic King and Queen of England, Scotland and Ireland. The cousin of Pope Innocent XIII, Francesco Maria Conti, from Siena, was here the Gentiluomo di Camera (Gentleman of the Bedchamber) in the little Roman Jacobite court.

For over two generations it remained the seat of the Stuart court-in-exile. It was the birthplace of James's two sons, Charles Edward Stuart (or 'Bonnie Prince Charlie') in 1720, and Henry Benedict Stuart (later Cardinal, Duke of York) in 1725. James Stuart died in the Palazzo in 1766. Charles died in the Palazzo in 1788. After Charles' death, the tenancy passed to Henry, the last of the Stuart pretenders, who died in Frascati in 1807.

== Alternative names ==
Plaque in the porte cochere of the Palazzo Muti, commemorating the Stuart occupancy.

The various names given to the Palazzo can be confusing, especially as the Muti Papazzurri family built other residences bearing their name in Rome. The Palazzo is most often referred to by Romans simply as the Palazzo Muti or the Palazzo Balestra, the Balestra being a family who lived in the palazzo for a time. The Balestra had their name carved on a keystone above the entrance. Balestra is Italian for crossbow, and it is likely that the Balestra crest of a crossbow lent its name to the adjacent alley "via dell'Archetto" (Archetto being Italian for bow). Thus the connection to the Balestra appears in two differing names of the palazzo.

During and after its occupancy by the Stuart family it has sometimes been referred to as the Palazzo Stuart. This is given further weight by the existence of a large plaque documenting the Stuart period of the palazzo. This tablet is situated in the corridor from the main entrance leading to the courtyard.

Today the palazzo is used as offices, but the public is permitted to walk into the courtyard.
