= Skanderbeg (disambiguation) =

Skanderbeg (sometimes Scanderbeg, Skenderbeg or Skënderbeu) may refer to:

== People ==
- Gjergj Kastrioti Skanderbeg (1405–1468), Albanian nobleman and military commander, national hero
- Skender Bey Crnojević (1457–1530), member of the Crnojević family of Zeta and Ottoman sanjakbey of the Sanjak of Scutari in 1513–30
- Military pseudonym of Rafael Moshe Kamhi (1870–1970), Macedonian revolutionary
- Wilhelm, Prince of Albania (1876–1945), also known as Skanderbeg II
- Zog I (1895–1961), also known as Skanderbeg III

== Places ==
- Skanderbeg Square in Tirana, Albania
- Skanderbeg Square in Pristina, Kosovo
- Skanderbeg Square in Skopje, North Macedonia
- Skanderbeg Museum in Krujë, Albania
- Skanderbeg Monument in Tirana, Albania
- Skanderbeg Military University in Tirana, Albania
- Skënderbeu Stadium in Korçë, Albania
- Palazzo Skanderbeg, palazzo in Rome, Italy
- Piazza Scanderbeg, square in Rome, Italy
- Skanderbeg Mountains, mountain range in Albania

== Culture ==
- The Great Warrior Skanderbeg, a 1953 Albanian film
- Scanderbeg, a 1718 opera by Antonio Vivaldi
- Scanderberg, a 1735 opera by François Francoeur and François Rebel

== Other ==
- 21st Waffen Mountain Division of the SS Skanderbeg, Albanian SS division, 1944–45
- Skanderbeg (military unit), Albanian quisling military unit assigned to the 14th Italian Army Corps, to participate in the Italian counteroffensive against insurgents in Montenegro, during the 1941 uprising in Montenegro
- KF Skënderbeu, football team based in Korçë, Albania
- Order of Skanderbeg, an honorary decoration given in Albania to Albanian and foreign citizens that have made an important contribution to the defence, reinforcement and development of Albania and is awarded by the Albanian President
- Skanderbeg, a steamboat used for transport of the goods and passengers mostly on Skadar Lake in Montenegro in the first half of the 20th century

== See also ==
- Skanderborg
