= Teatro Unione, Viterbo =

Theatre in Viterbo, Italy

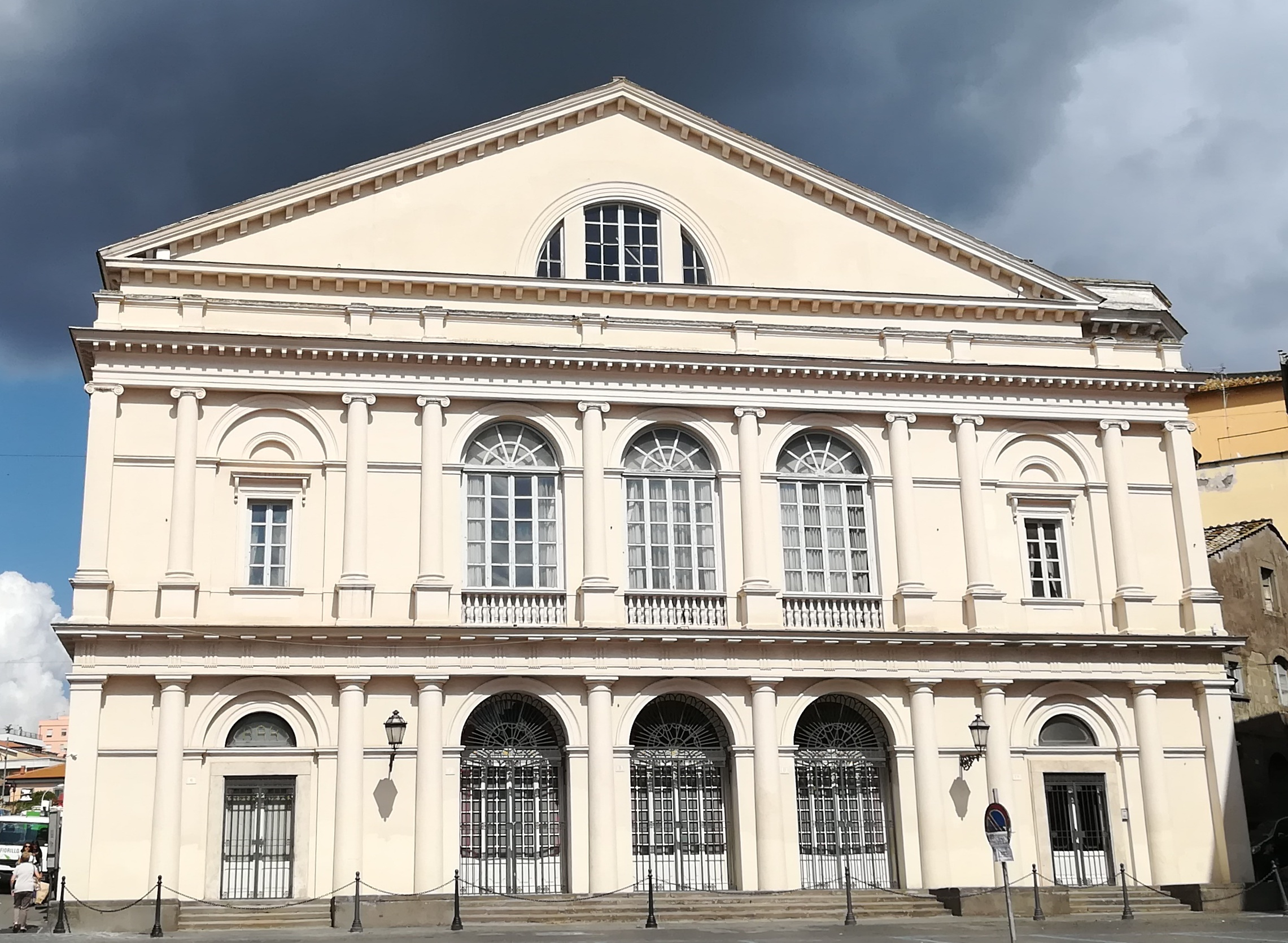
- Teatro dell'Unione
- Interactive map of Teatro Unione, Viterbo
- Address: Piazza Giuseppe Verdi #7; Viterbo; Italy
- Coordinates: 42.42096°N 12.10841°E

Construction
- Opened: 1855
- Rebuilt: 1952
- Architect: Virginio Vespignani

Website
- Teatro dell'Unione

Teatro Unione or Teatro dell'Unione is the main theater stage in Viterbo, Italy, for live dramatic and musical performances. Located at the eastern edge of historic Viterbo, on piazza Giuseppe Verdi, diagonally across from the Biblioteca Comunale degli Ardenti (Civic Library) which partly occupies the former Palazzo Santoro.

== History and description ==
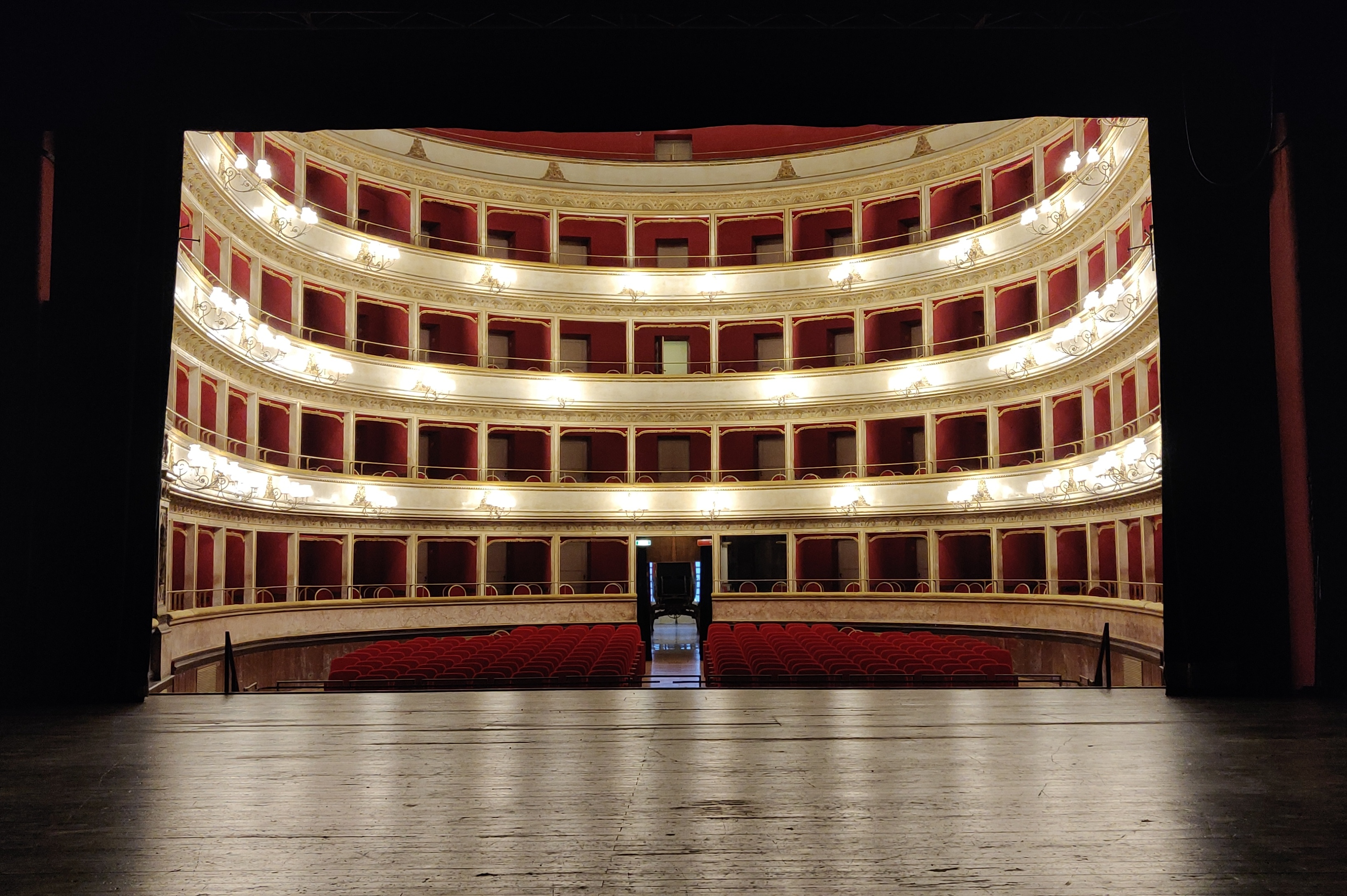
View from the stage of the seating

The construction of the Neoclassical-style theater was patronized by prominent citizens of Viterbo, under the lead of Count Tommaso Fani Ciotti. In 1844, they formed the Società dei Palchettisti (Society of theater balcony box owners), and this united group gave name to the theater. Till then, the main but smaller theater in town had been one called Teatro del Genio di Viterbo. The architect Virginio Vespignani was chosen to design the structure. It was inaugurated in 1855. The theater was heavily damaged by the bombardment (in 1944) during World War II, damaging the original frescoes. It was restored and re-inaugurated in 1952.
