= James White (sculptor) =

Australian sculptor

- Born: 2 December 1861; Liverpool, Lancashire, England
- Died: 14 July 1918 (aged 56); Brisbane, Australia
- Known for: Sculptor
- Awards: Wynne Prize in 1902

James White (2 December 1861 – 14 July 1918) was an Australian sculptor, winner of the Wynne Prize in 1902.

== Early life ==
White was born in Liverpool, Lancashire, England, the son of Robert White, journeyman shipwright, and his wife Janet, née Dunn. White was apprenticed to a plasterer and studied modelling at South Kensington. White made anatomical models for hospitals in London.

== Australian period ==
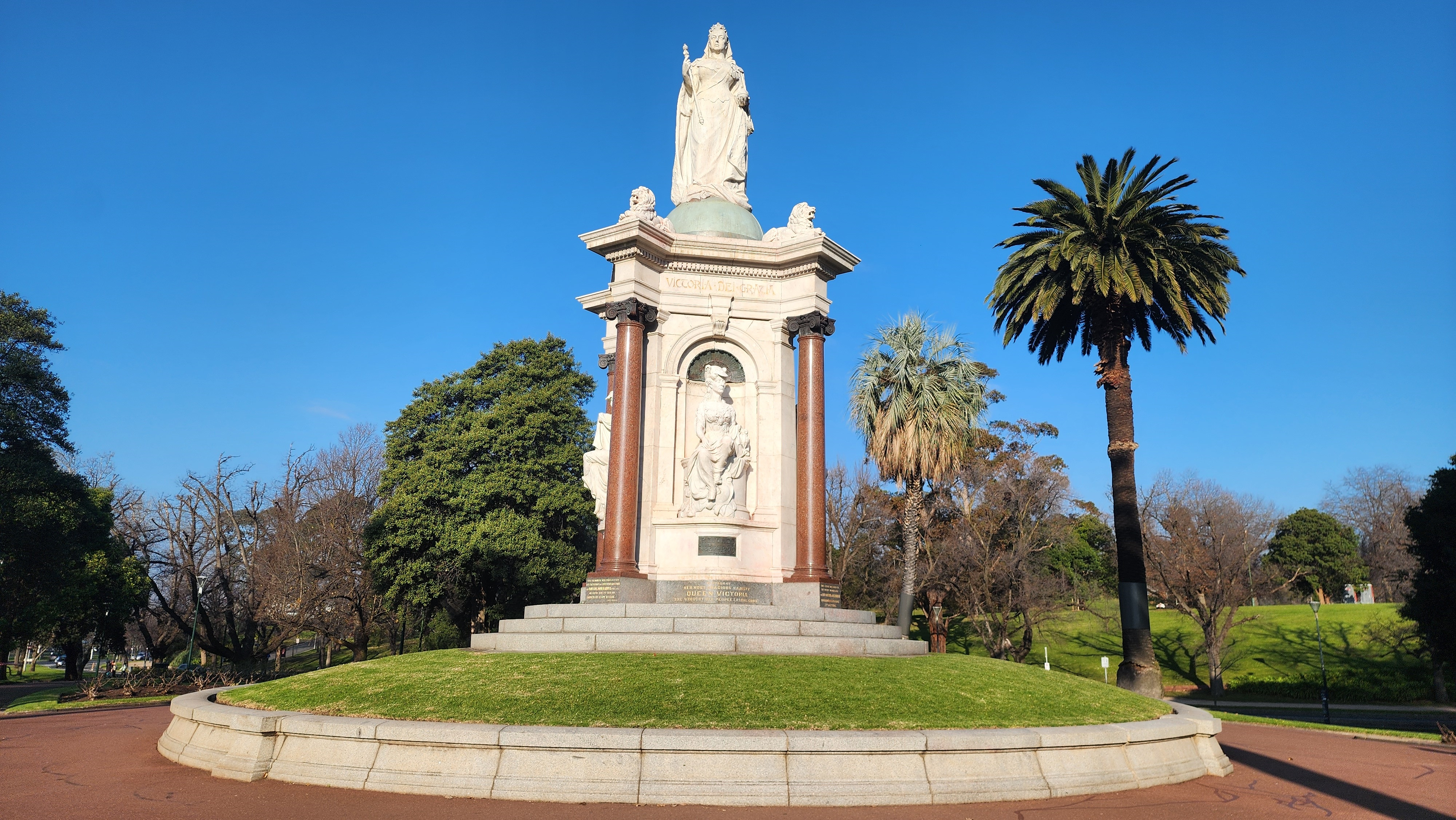
Queen Victoria Memorial in Queen Victoria Gardens, Melbourne

White came to Sydney around 1884 and worked for Achille Simonetti on the monument to Governor Arthur Phillip in the Royal Botanic Garden there. White won the Wynne Prize for the group 'In Defence of the Flag' at Sydney in 1902.

== Later life ==
White died of cancer while visiting Brisbane and was buried in Toowong Cemetery. He was survived by his wife, son and two daughters.

== Selected works ==
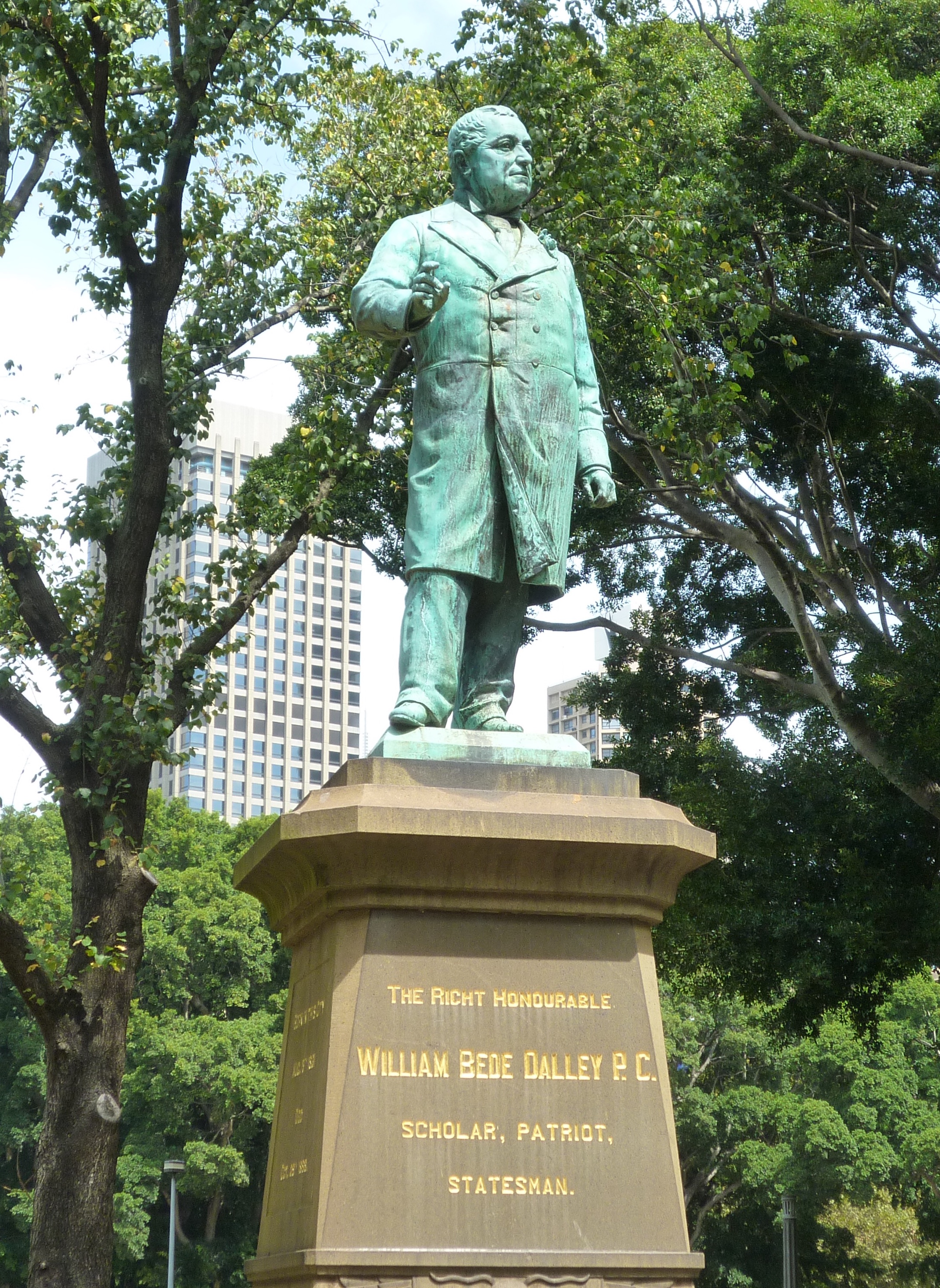
William Bede Dalley statue, Hyde Park, Sydney

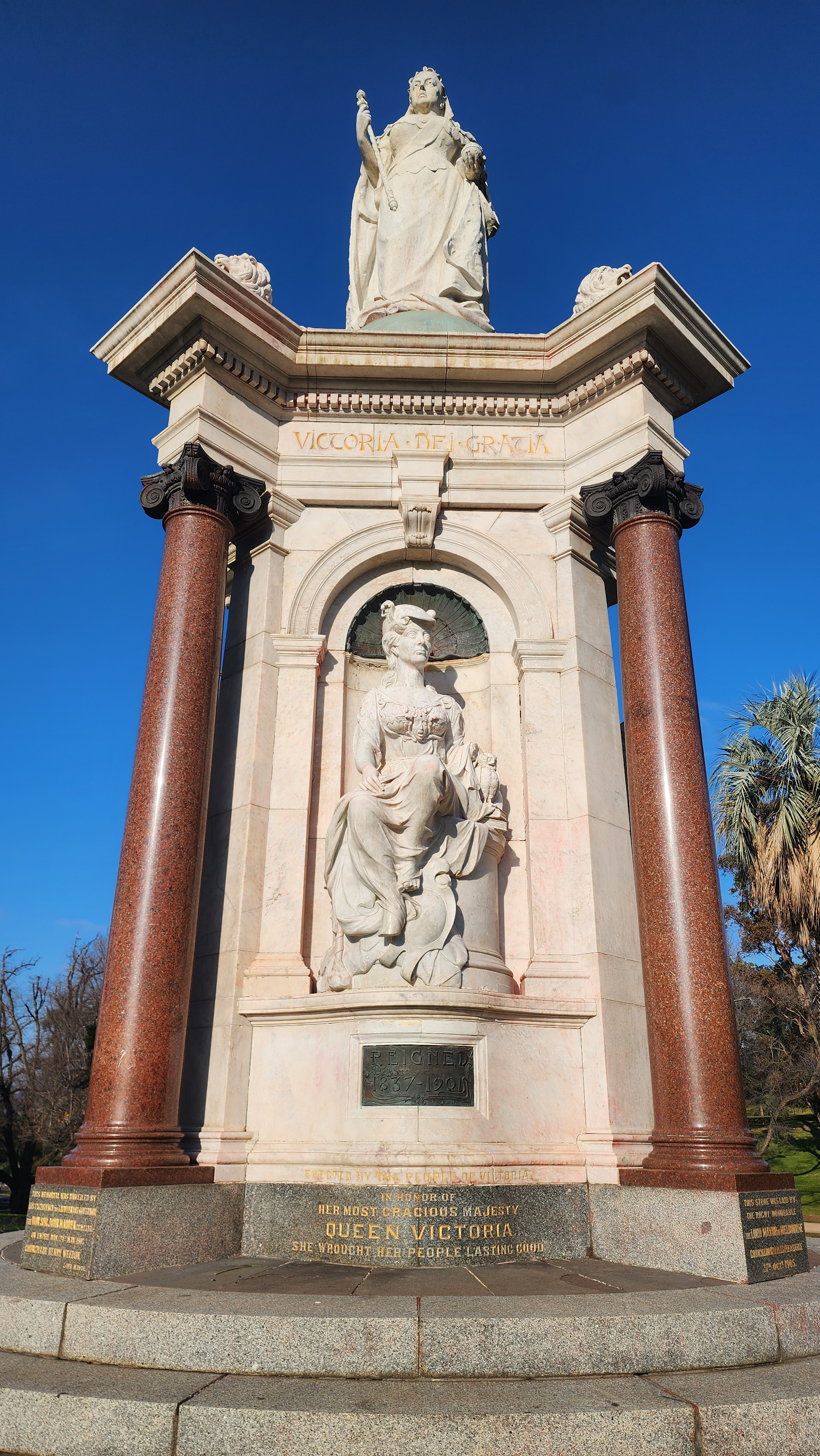
Queen Victoria Memorial, Melbourne

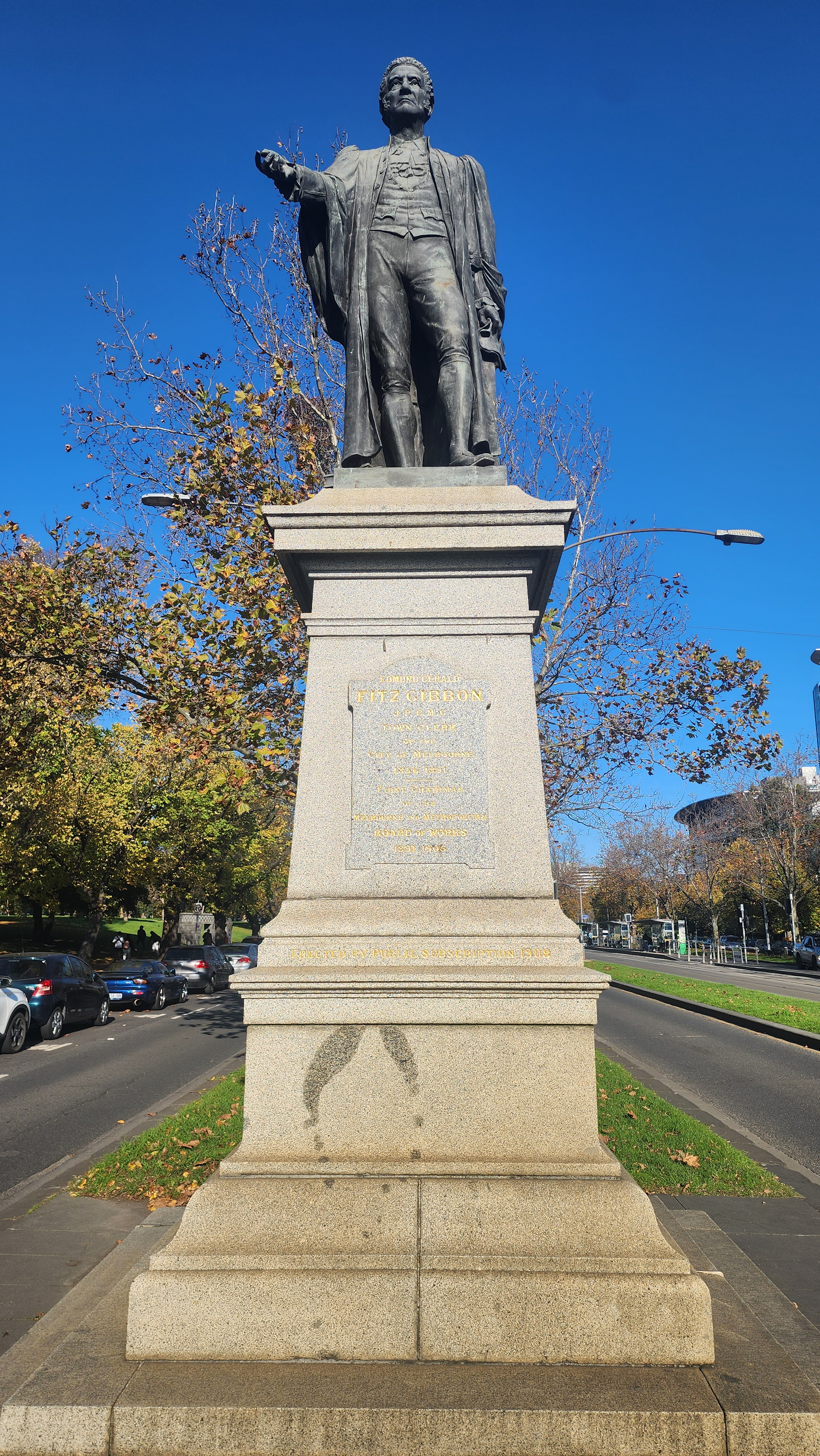
Edmund Fitzgibbon statue, Melbourne

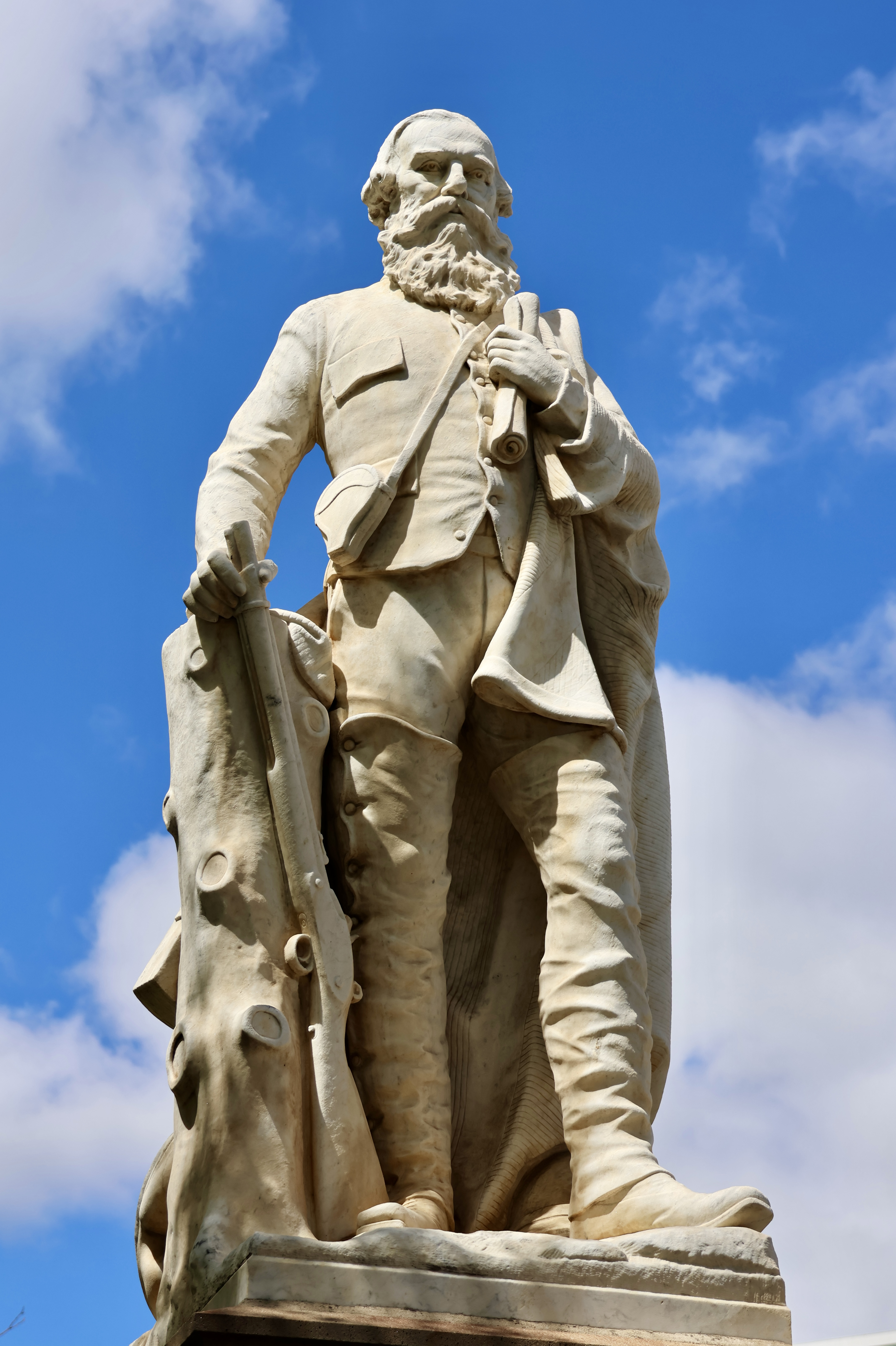
Statue of John McDouall Stuart, Victoria Square, Adelaide.

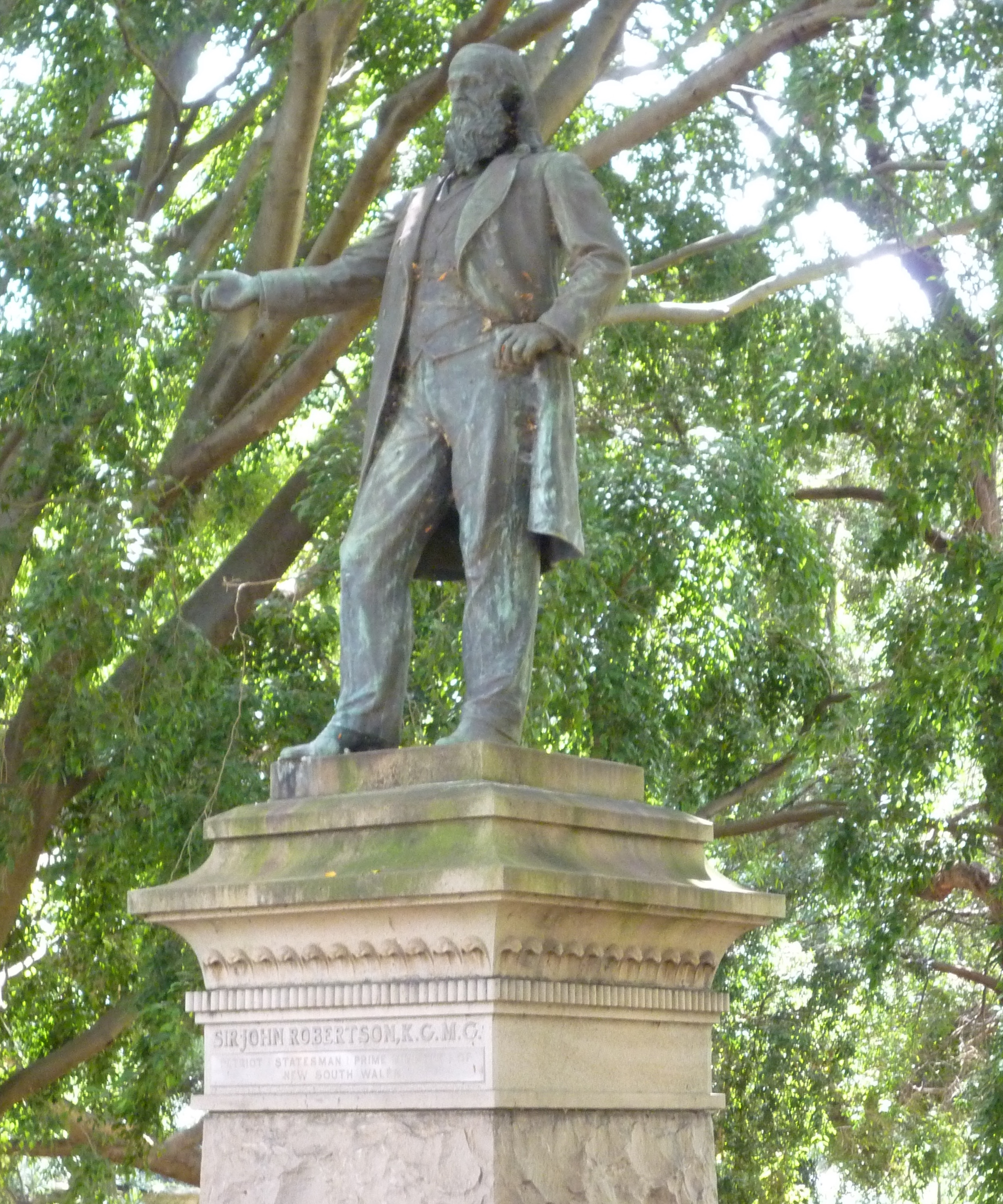
Sir John Robertson in the Domain, Sydney

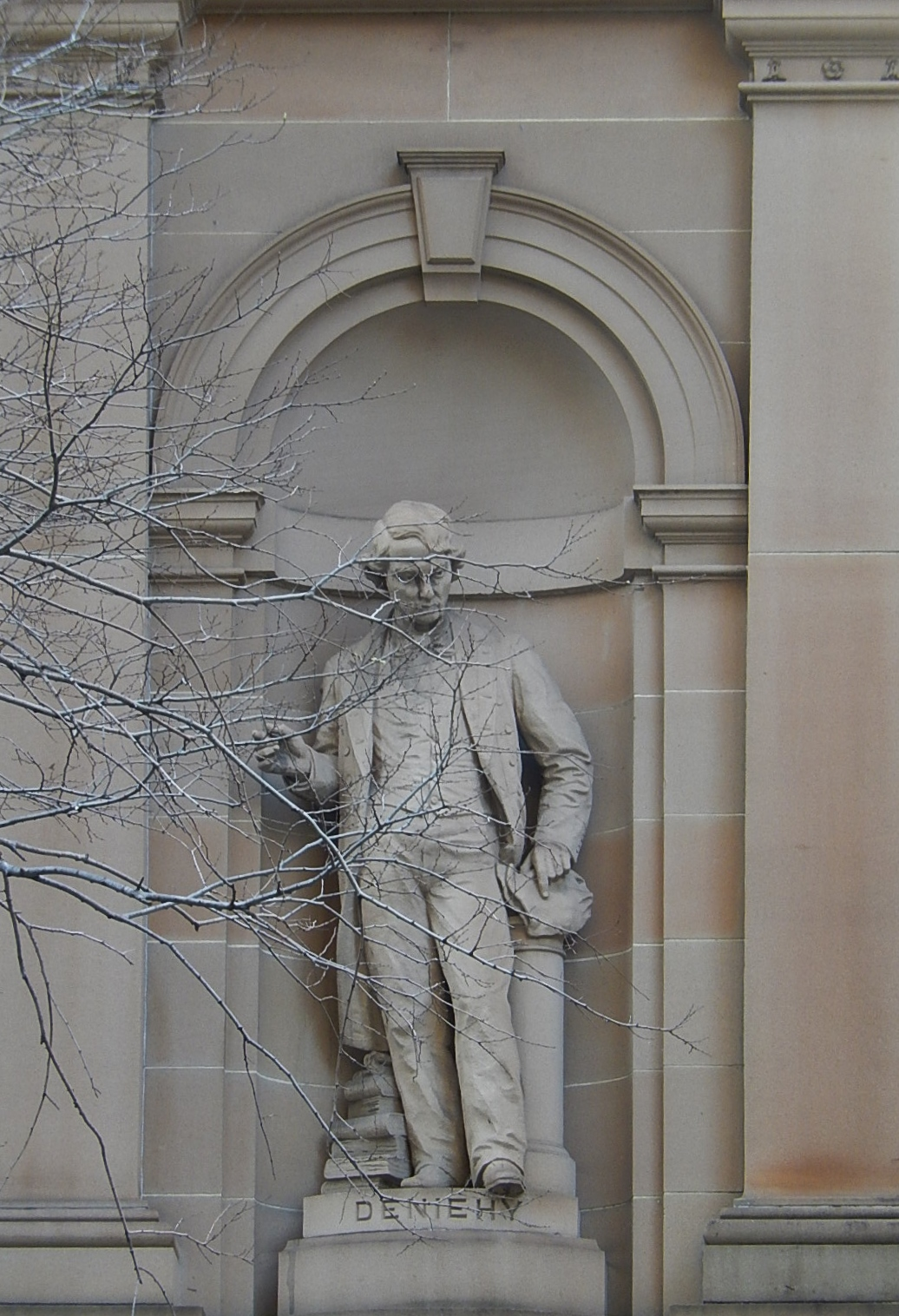
Statue of Daniel Deniehy, Lands Department Building, Sydney.
The South African War Memorial, Kings Park, Perth by White. The panels entitled "in defence of the flag" won the Wynne Prize in 1902.<ref>"Archibald Prize Wynne 1902 work: In defence of the flag by James S White". www.artgallery.nsw.gov.au.</ref>

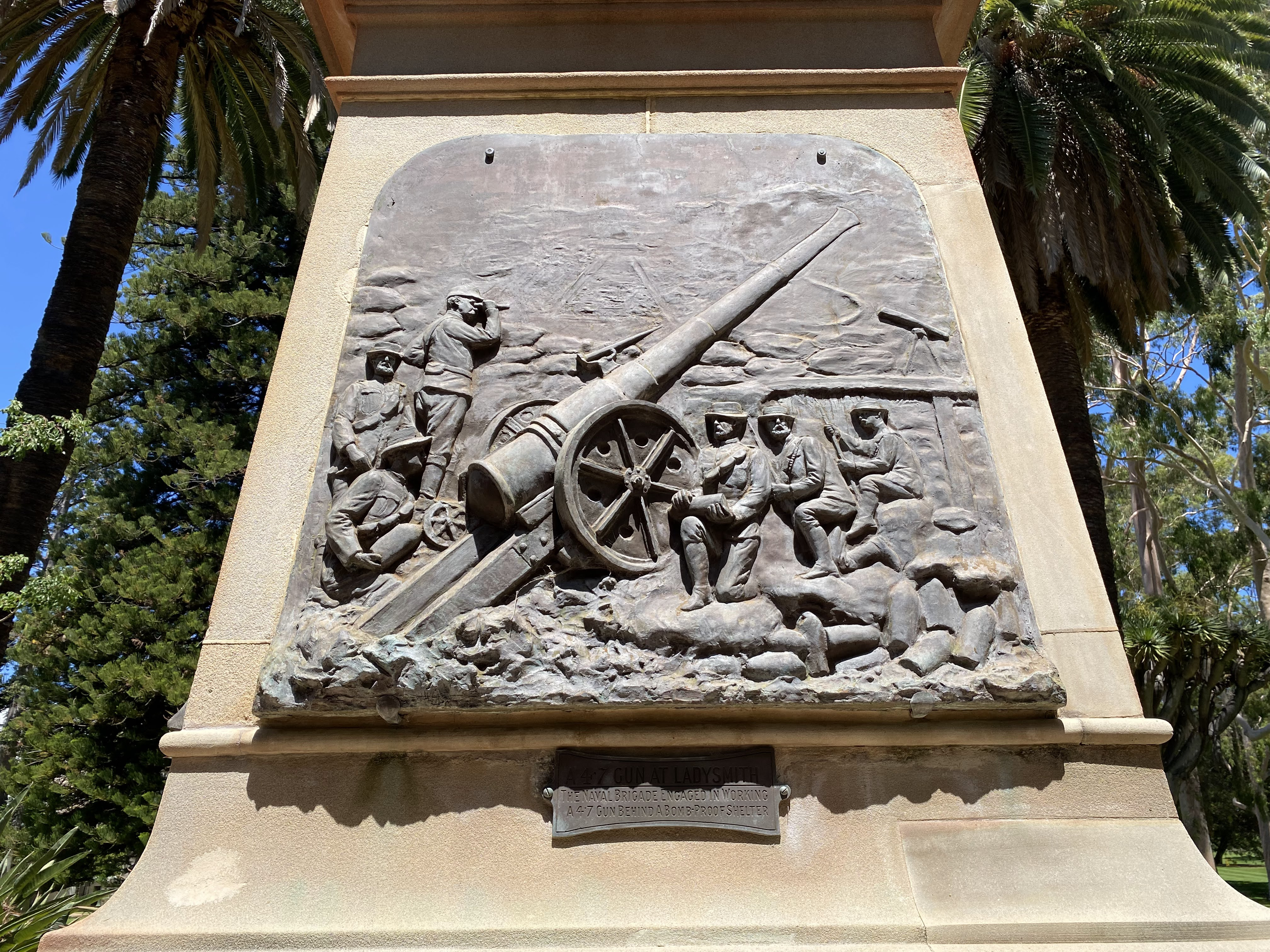

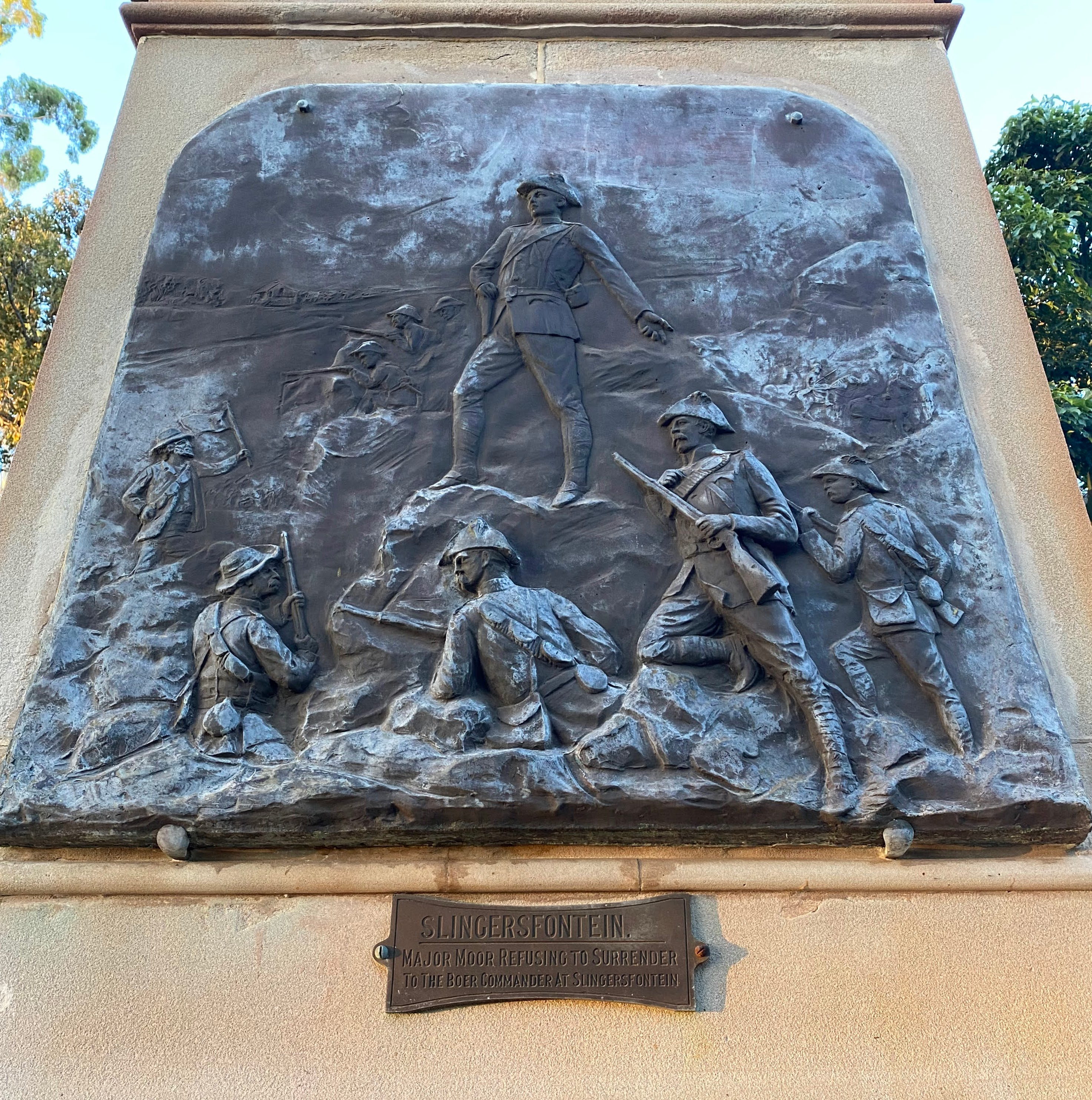

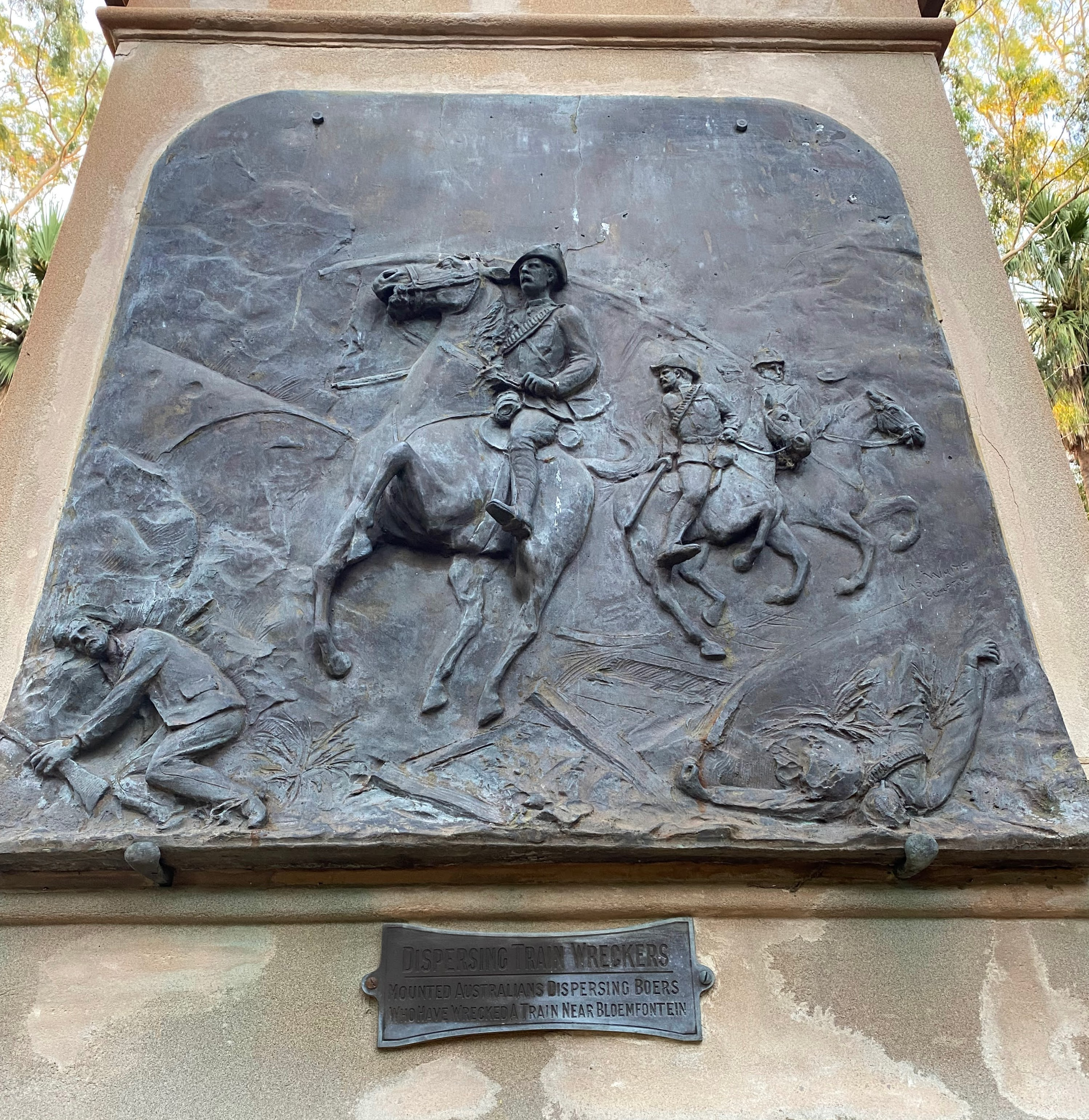

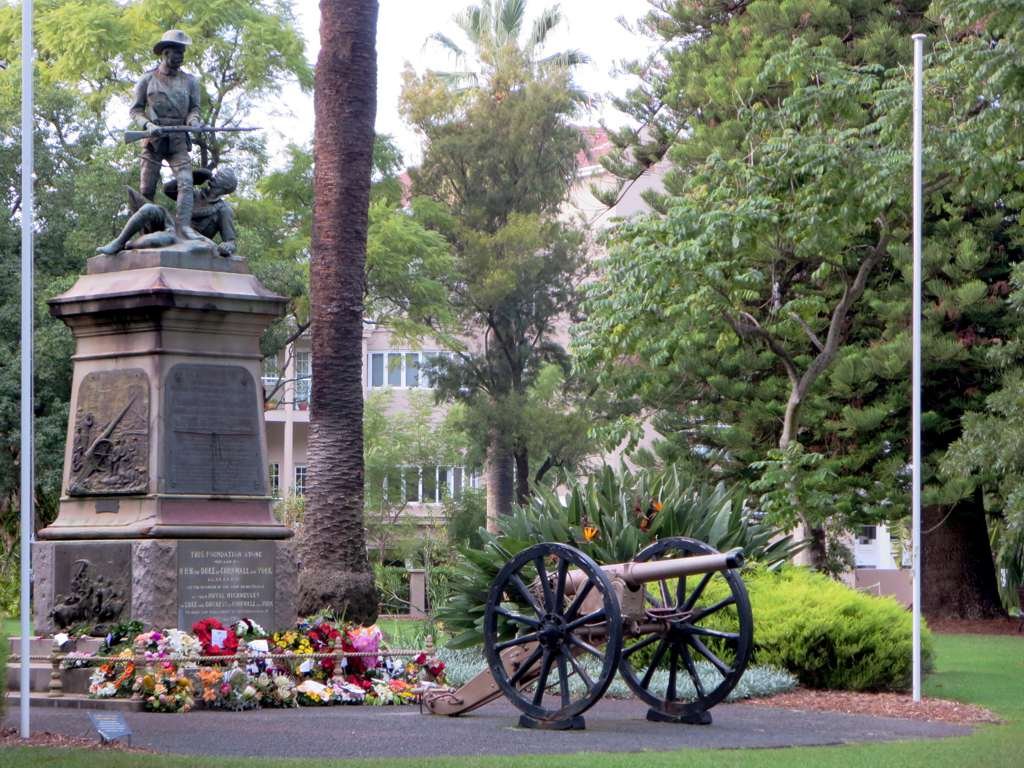
