= Madonna dell'Archetto =

Madonna dell'Archetto Church in Italy

Madonna dell'Archetto S. Maria Causa Nostrae Laetitiae
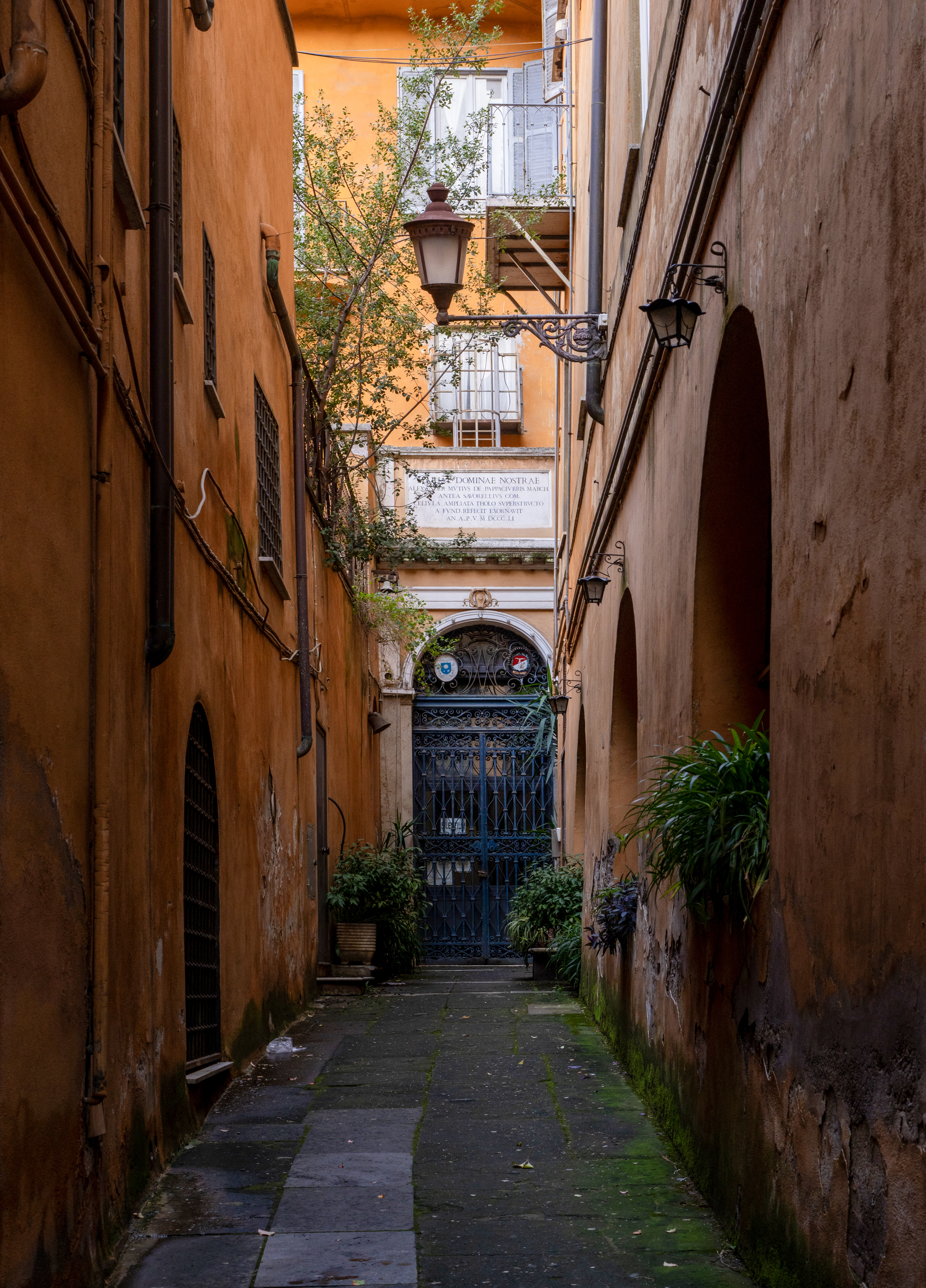
- The alleyway and the entrance to the chapel

Religion
- Affiliation: Roman Catholic
- Ecclesiastical or organisational status: Titular Church

Location
- Location: Via di San Marcello 41b, Rome (RM), Italy
- Interactive map of Madonna dell'Archetto; S. Maria Causa Nostrae Laetitiae
- Coordinates: 41°53′56″N 12°28′58″E

Architecture
- Architect: Virginio Vespignani
- Style: Neo-Renaissance
- Completed: May 31, 1851

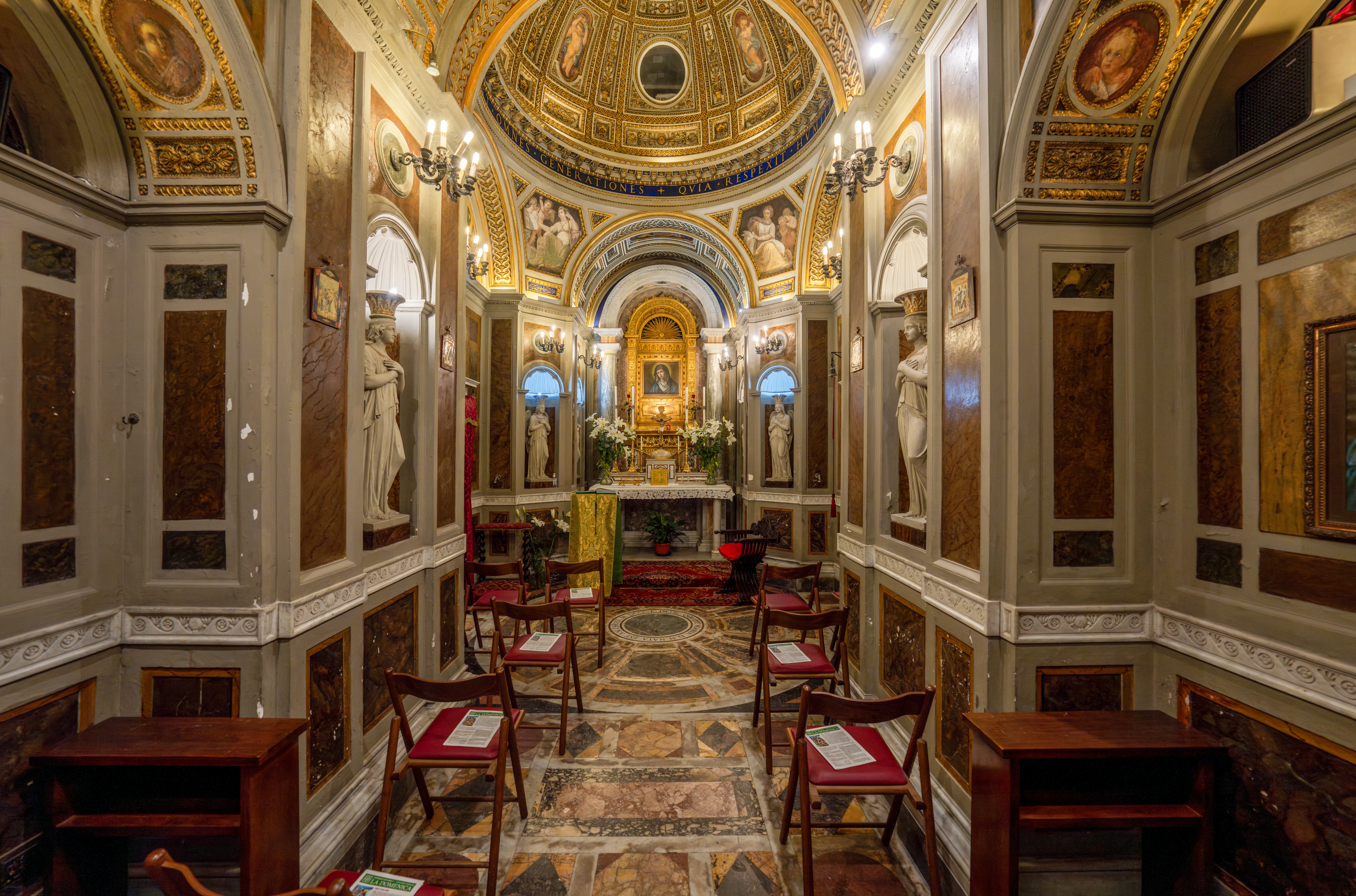
Interior

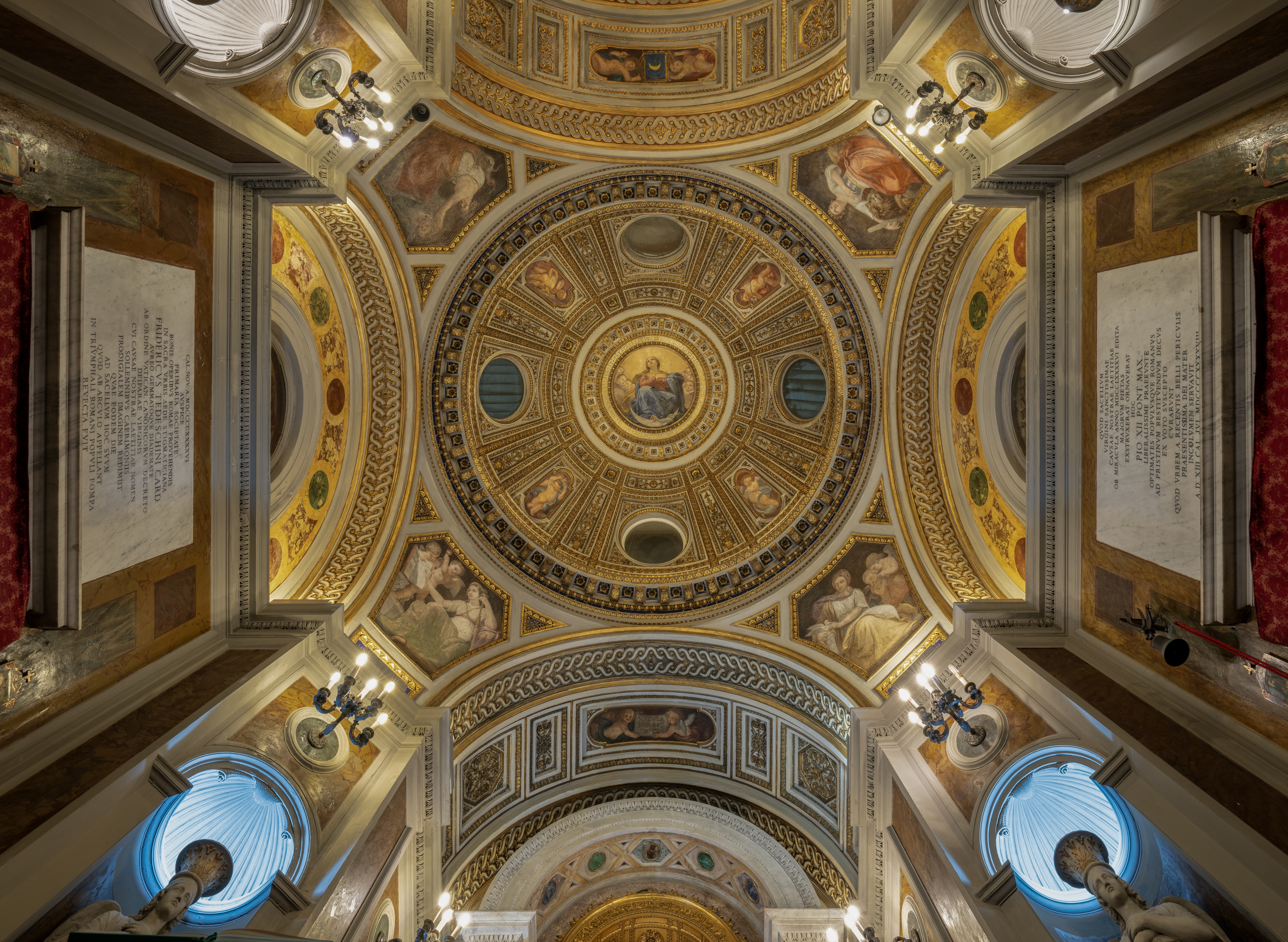
The dome by Constantino Brumidi

The Church of the Madonna dell'Archetto (English: Our Lady of the Little Arch) is a small oratory in Rome, Italy, in the Trevi rione. The official title of the church is Santa Maria Causa Nostrae Laetitiae (English: Holy Mary, Cause of Our Joy). It is often cited as being the smallest church in Rome.

== History and description ==
The chapel was constructed in the nineteenth century to house a venerated image of the Madonna that was located under a narrow arched passageway of the Palazzo Muti, The image had been commissioned by the marchesa Muti Papazzurri in 1690. It is a depiction painted by Bolognese painter Domenico Muratori on maiolica of the Blessed Virgin. In 1696, the image was reputedly seen to move her eyes, which prompted the owner to expose the image to public veneration. By 1751, gates to the alley where the image was located were installed, and a repeat miracle on July 9, 1796, cemented the reputation of the image. The 1796 incident occurred before numerous witnesses, who also observed that the eyes of the painting wept—presumably in reaction to that year's invasion of the Papal States by France.

In the middle of the nineteenth century, marchese Alessandro Muti Papazzurri Savorelli decided to construct a small chapel to house the miraculous image, which until that point was still located in a narrow alley. The chapel, which was built in the available space at the end of the alleyway, is an example, rare in Rome, of Neo-Renaissance architecture. The interior was covered in precious marbles, the work of architect Virginio Vespignani. The cupola was frescoed by Constantino Brumidi, the same painter who executed the frescoes in the United States Capitol. There are also sculptures by Luigi Simonetti. The miraculous image of the Virgin is located above the altar. The church was solemnly dedicated on May 31, 1851.

The oratory today falls within the parish boundaries of the nearby Basilica of Santi Apostoli.

== Inscription ==
The Jesuit archaeologist Giuseppe Marchi composed the following Latin inscription, which is located on the exterior of the chapel:

Latin

MARIAE DOMINAE NOSTRAE
ALEXANDER MVTIVS DE PAPPACIVRRIS MARCH.
ANTEA SAVORELLIVS COMES
CELLVLA AMPLIATA TITVLO SVPEREXTRVCTO
A FVND. REFECIT EXORNAVIT
AN. A. P. V. MDCCCLI.

English

To [the honor of] Mary, Our Lady
Alessandro Muti, Marchese de Papazzurri,
formerly Count Savorelli,
[this] chamber having been expanded, restored it from its foundations
[and] decorated it with this inscription put above it,
in the year 1851 since the childbearing of the Virgin.

== Sources ==
- Armellini, Mariano (1891). Le chiese di Roma dal secolo IV al XIX. Rome: Tipografia Vaticana. pp. 256–257.
- Pratesi, Ludovico (2000). "Rione II Trevi". I rioni di Roma. Vol. I. Milan: Newton & Compton Editori. pp. 131–201.
- Rendina, Claudio (2000). Le Chiese di Roma. Milan: Newton & Compton Editori.
