= Santa Croce e San Bonaventura alla Pilotta =

- Church of the Holy Cross and Saint Bonaventure at Piazza della Pilotta
- Santa Croce e San Bonaventura dei Lucchesi
- Chiesa di Santa Croce e San Bonaventura alla Pilotta
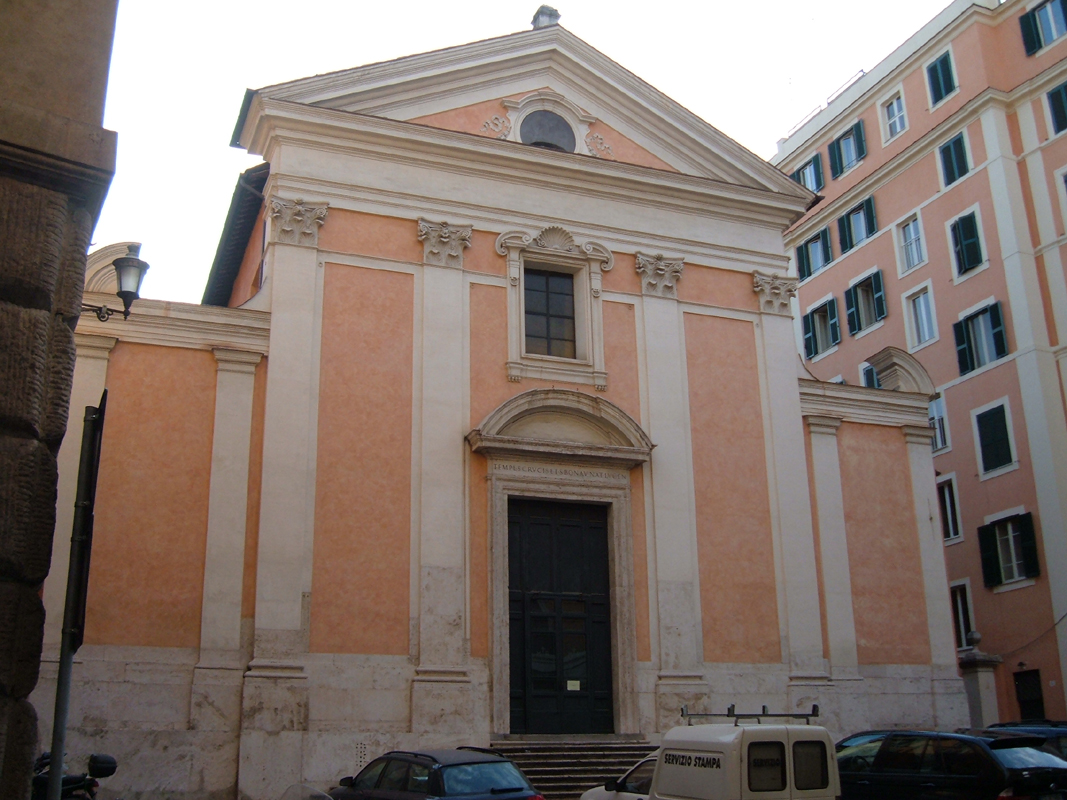
- Click on the map for a fullscreen view
- 41°53′59″N 12°29′04″E
- Location: Via dei Lucchesi 3, Trevi, Rome
- Country: Italy
- Language: Italian
- Denomination: Catholic
- Tradition: Roman Rite
- Religious order: Sisters of Mary Reparatrix

History
- Status: regional church
- Dedication: Holy Cross and Bonaventure

Architecture
- Functional status: active
- Architectural type: Baroque
- Completed: 1575

Administration
- Diocese: Rome

Santa Croce e San Bonaventura alla Pilotta or Santa Croce e di San Bonaventura dei Lucchesi is a church in Rome, sited on via dei Lucchesi in the Trevi district, between the Trevi Fountain and the Pontificia Università Gregoriana. It is Lucca's regional church in Rome.

== History ==
The church is on the site of a medieval church San Nicola de Portiis or San Nicola de Trivio, whose remains can be seen in the present church's crypt. That church had been given to the Capuchin fathers in 1575, who had rededicated it to saint Bonaventure. They moved to a new monastery on Piazza Barberini in 1631 and the church was granted to the Luccans by pope Urban VIII. There was already a small Luccan community in Rome, mainly made up of merchants. They demolished the old church in 1685 and built a new one in 1695 to designs by Mattia de Rossi and dedicated to the Most Holy Cross (Santissima Croce), after the cult of the 'Volto Santo', a piece of the True Cross venerated in Lucca Cathedral. It was restored in the course of the 19th century.

== Bibliography ==
- M. Armellini, Le chiese di Roma dal secolo IV al XIX, Roma 1891, p. 261
- C. Hülsen, Le Chiese di Roma nel Medio Evo, Firenze 1927, pp. 407–408
- F. Titi, Descrizione delle Pitture, Sculture e Architetture esposte in Roma, Roma 1763, pp. 312–313
- C. Rendina, Le Chiese di Roma, Newton & Compton Editori, Milano 2000, p. 82
- L. Pratesi, Rione II Trevi, in AA.VV, I rioni di Roma, Newton & Compton Editori, Milano 2000, Vol. I, pp. 131–201
