= Teatro del Genio di Viterbo =

Theatre in Viterbo, Italy

Coordinates: 42°25′04.2″N 12°06′23.9″E

The Teatro del Genio di Viterbo (Theater of the Genius of Viterbo) is the theatre stage and movie theatre in central Viterbo, region of Lazio, Italy. Located at the end of the dead-ended alleyway of Via del Teatro Genio. It is located around the block from Piazza del Erbe. While this was the earliest public theatre in Viterbo, after 1855 it was replaced as the main stage and opera house in town by the Teatro dell'Unione; it is presently shuttered.

== History and description ==
In 1719, a merchant with business in piazza delle Erbe, named Bartolomeo Spigaglia, purchased this property behind the church of Santa Maria Egiziaca. He built a theatre, named Teatro dei Mercanti with 4 stories of balcony boxes. The first performances on 18 May 1721 were booked to celebrate the ascension of Pope Innocent XIII. In 1804, the Comune of Viterbo bought the Teatro dei Mercanti. The site was restored and enlarged under the designs of the architect Tommaso Giusti. It was reopened in 1805 under the name of Teatro del Genio del Cimino, soon to be known simply as the Teatro del Genio. The first work presented on 24 August 1805 was the opera buffa “La serva bizzarra” by Pietro Carlo Guglielmi.

After the opening of the Teatro dell'Unione in 1855, the stage fell into disuse, with only a single performance for the next decade. In 1877, after a further refurbishment and patronized by the local Accademia Filodrammatica, it was re-opened. It was closed again in 1882 with the new regulations banning indoor public theatres made of wood, because of the risk of fire. The interiors were gutted after 1911.

Starting in 1932, it became a small movie theatre, however it was destroyed during the Allied bombardment on 6 Jun 1944. Rebuilt, it was inaugurated again in 1948 as a movie theatre. By the 21st-century, it again had to close, and remains so.
