= Luigi Simonetti =

Italian sculptor (active 1834–1860)

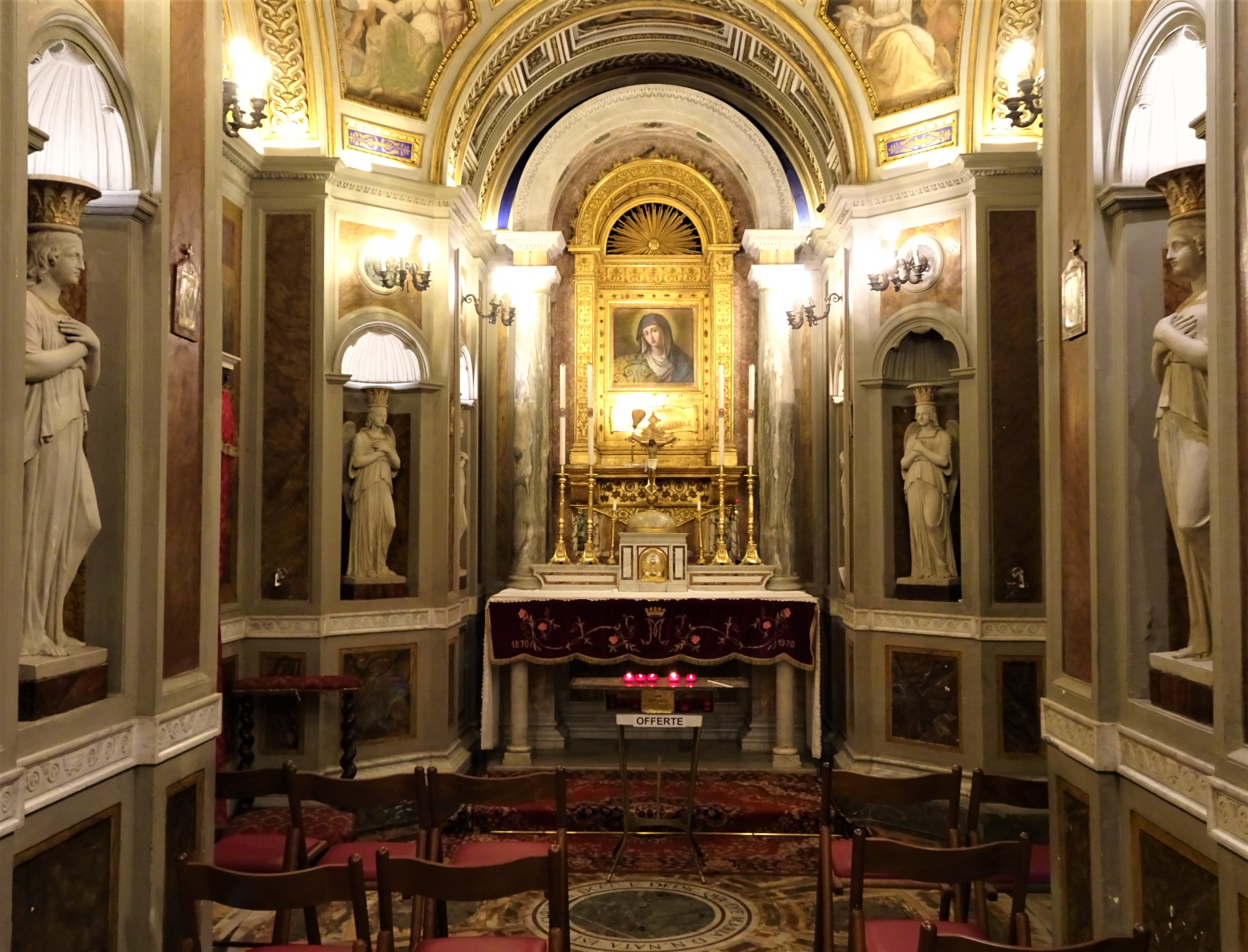
Angel statues for Madonna dell'Archetto

Luigi Simonetti (active 1834–1860) was a Neoclassical-style sculptor active mainly in Rome.

== Biography ==
Simonetti was born in Rome, Papal States. He studied at the Accademia San Luca. He sculpted a portrait of John Carter Brown on display in the Newport Art Museum. He sculpted statues of angels for the small church of Madonna dell'Archetto in Rome. He sculpted the tomb monument for Carlo Balestra and Caterina Marini in the church of Santa Maria del Popolo, Rome.

He was the father of Achille, a prominent sculptor who moved to Australia.
