= Achille Simonetti (sculptor) =

Australian sculptor (1838–1900)

Achille Simonetti (1838–1900) was a sculptor in Australia. He undertook many important commissions.

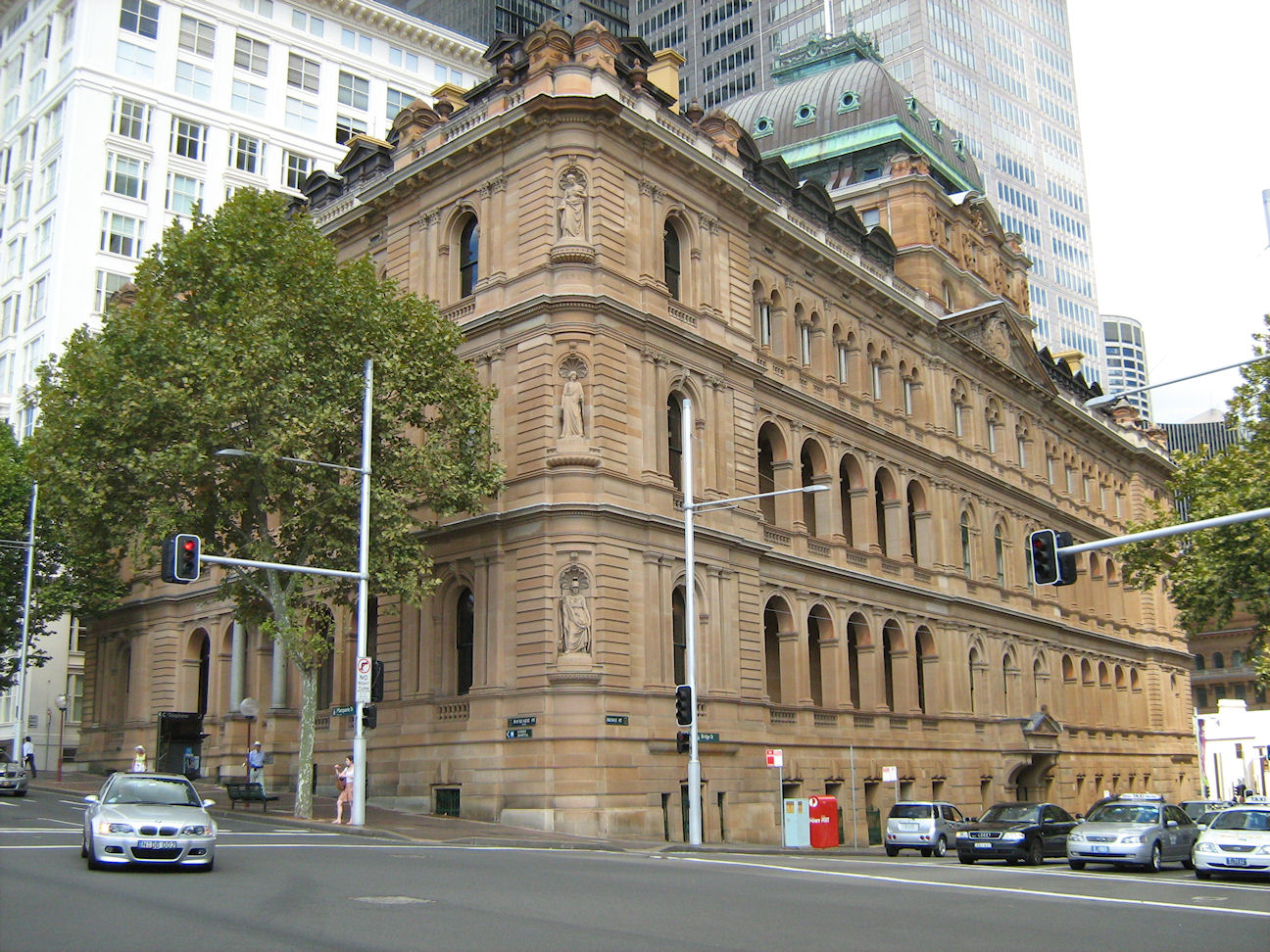
Colonial Secretary's Building, Macquarie Street, Sydney featuring statues by Simonetti.

== Early life ==
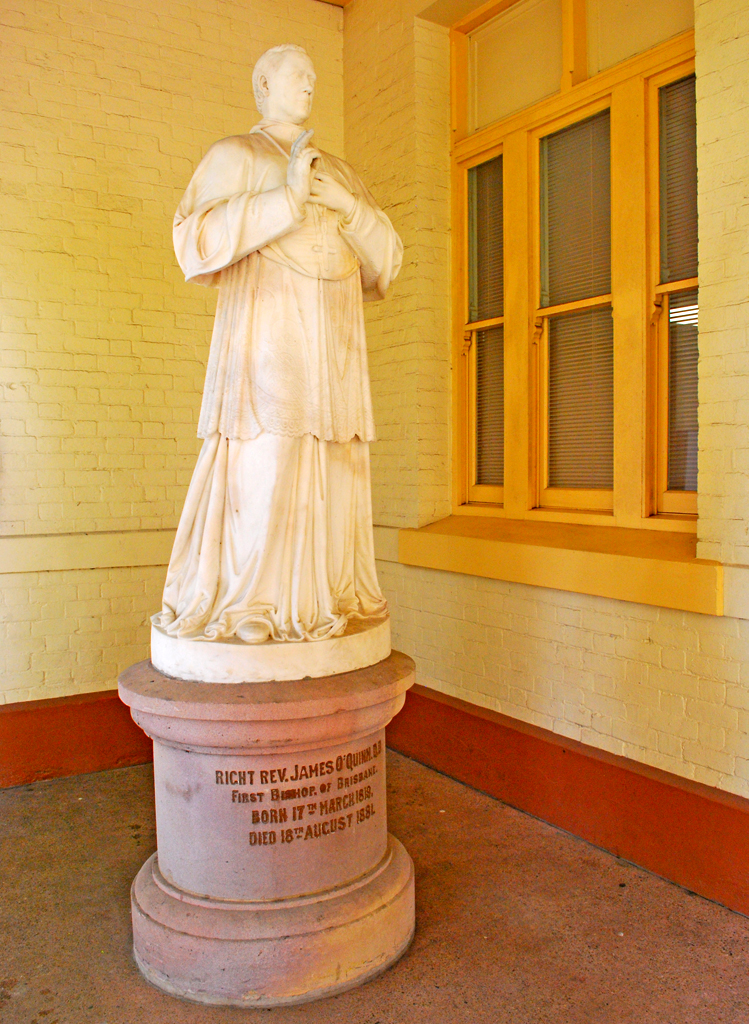
Marble statue by Simonetti of James Quinn, now located at 249 Elizabeth Street, old St Stephen's School, Brisbane.

Simonetti was born in Rome, Papal States, the son of Luigi Simonetti, a prominent neoclassical sculptor in Rome.

== Career ==
In 1871 James O'Quinn, Roman Catholic Bishop of Brisbane, persuaded Simonetti to immigrate to Brisbane, Queensland. By 1874 he moved to Sydney establishing a studio in Balmain.

== Later life ==
Simonetti died after a two-week illness on 23 March 1900 at his residence and studio in Balmain, Sydney, New South Wales. He was buried in the Roman Catholic section of Rookwood Cemetery.

At the time of his death, he was designing on a statue of the late Queensland Premier Thomas Joseph Byrnes. Although there was a proposal that Simonetti's former pupil James White might continue the work, the commission was given to Melbourne sculptor Bertram Mackennal who completed the status in 1902. It was placed at the corner of Queen, Wickham, Ann and Boundary Streets in Brisbane (which was later redeveloped to create Centenary Place).

== Significant works ==
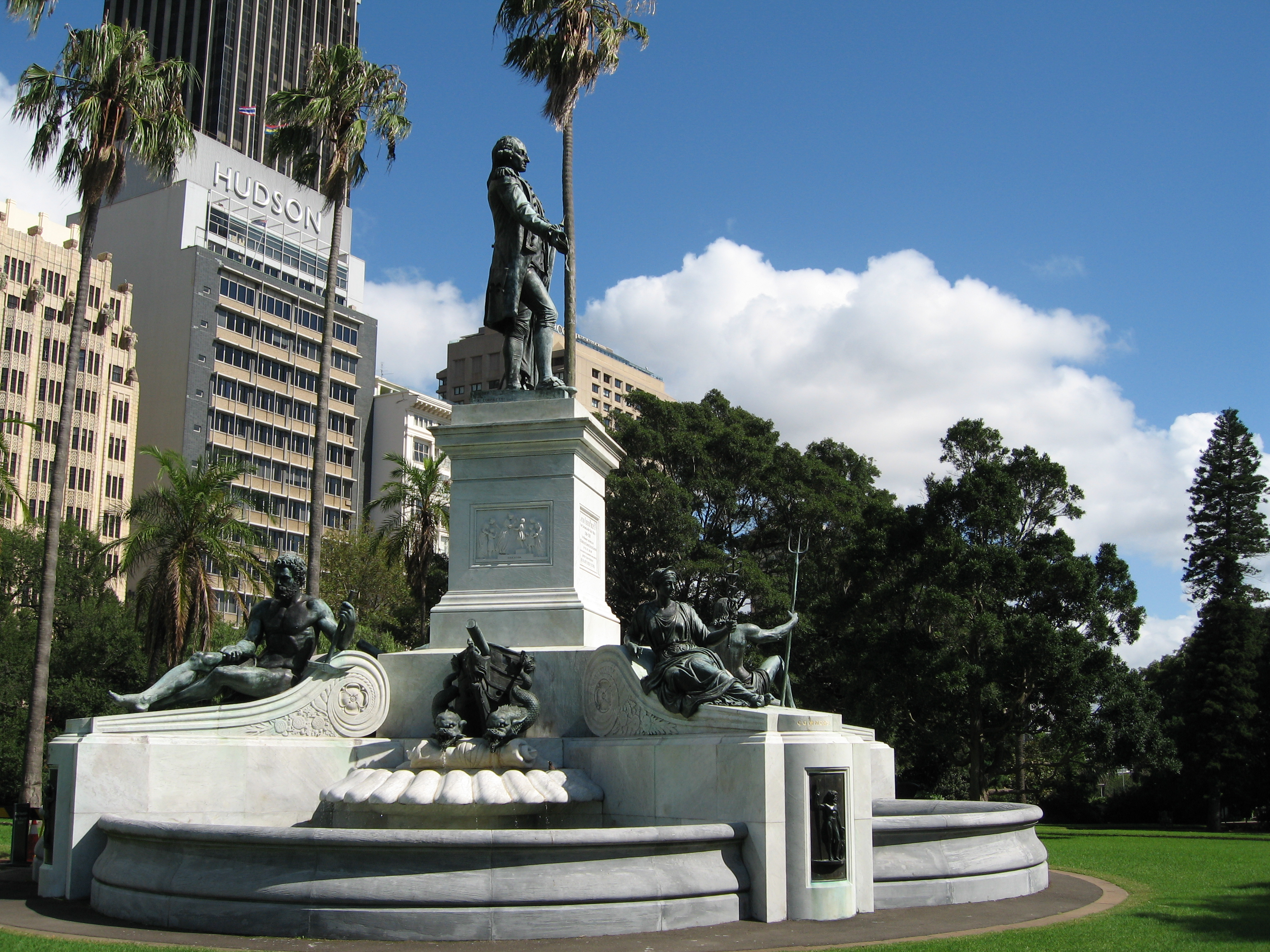
Statue of Arthur Phillip, by Simonetti, in the Botanic Gardens, Sydney, Australia

- 1880s: Six statues in niches of the Colonial Secretary's Building, Macquarie Street, Sydney.
- 1892: Lifesize statue of the late James O'Quinn for St Stephen's Roman Catholic Cathedral in Brisbane
- 1897: Statue of Arthur Phillip, first Governor of New South Wales, in Sydney
