= Virginio Vespignani =

Italian architect

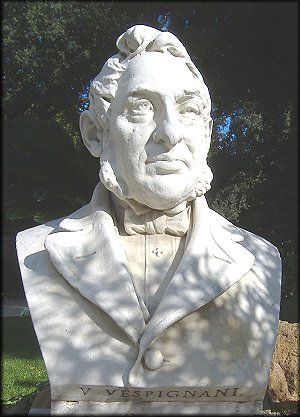
- Bust of Virginio Vespignani
- Born: 12 February 1808; Rome, Papal States
- Died: 4 December 1882 (aged 74); Rome, Kingdom of Italy
- Occupation: Architect
- Movement: Neoclassicism

Virginio Vespignani (12 February 1808 – 4 December 1882) was an Italian architect. He was one of the main figures of Roman Neoclassical architecture.

== Biography ==
=== Early life and education ===
Vespignani was born in Rome on 12 February 1808. As a young draughtsman he contributed illustrations to books popularizing Roman archaeology. He helped illustrate in collaboration with the engraver and architect Luigi Rossini a work on the Antiquities of Pompeii and later contributed illustrations to Edward Dodwell’s treatise I sette colli di Roma (London, 1829). Vespignani trained under Luigi Poletti and worked with him (1837–69) on the reconstruction of the Basilica of Saint Paul Outside the Walls, continuing the work on Poletti’s death in 1869. Three sides of the great quadriporticus were finished (1893) to his designs after his own death.

=== Career ===
A favourite of Pope Pius IX, Vespignani benefited from the many papal commissions generated during his reign. He applied historical revival styles to his work, for instance in his Church of the Madonna dell'Archetto (1851) in the Via di San Marcello, and the Confessio (1864) in Santa Maria Maggiore, both in Rome. Three early works were public monuments in Rome, including the new façade of the Porta Pia (1852–68), an eclectic work with elements borrowed from the Arch of Titus. In contrast, his Porta San Pancrazio (1857) and the entrance and cemetery chapel of Santa Maria della Misericordia in the Campo Verano are formal and restrained.

Other commissions in Rome followed, including the restoration of the 17th-century San Carlo ai Catinari (1861), the tabernacle of the high altar (after 1863) in Santa Maria in Trastevere and the restoration of San Lorenzo fuori le mura (1864–70; with Giovanni Battista de Rossi). On the Medieval Revival apse of the Archbasilica of Saint John Lateran (1874–84) and the church of San Tommaso di Canterbury (1888), he collaborated with his son Francesco Vespignani (1842–99), who finished them after his father’s death.

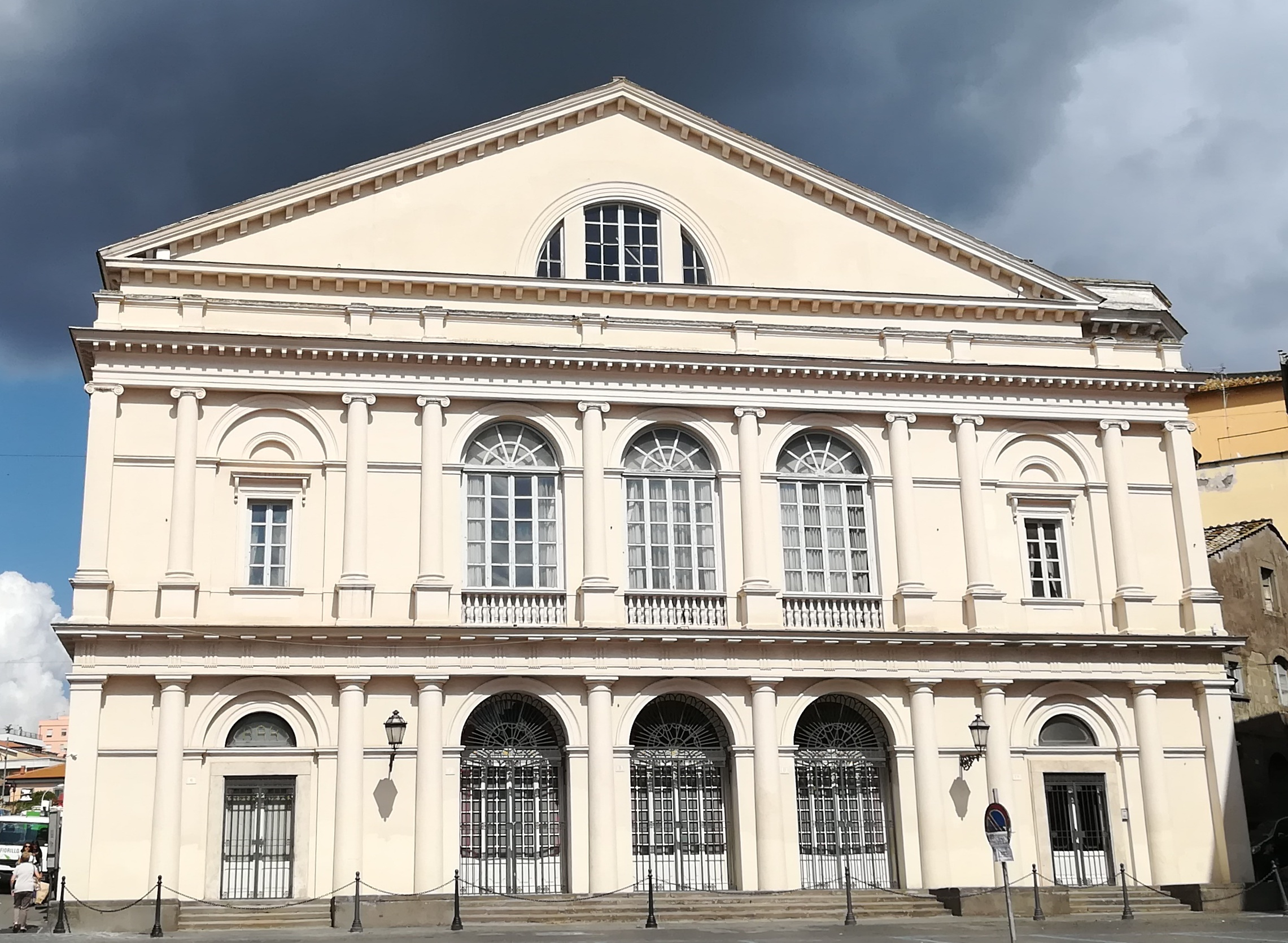
Teatro dell'Unione, Viterbo

The Serra all’Orto Botanico (1855) in glass and cast iron, his monument to Pope Pius IX in the Vatican, and the opera houses of Orvieto (Teatro Mancinelli) and Viterbo (Teatro dell'Unione) indicate the wide-ranging knowledge of materials and styles required of architects in mid-19th-century Rome.

Vespignani served on many boards and honorary memberships. He was city architect to Rome, a member of the pontifical commission on antiquities and President of the Accademia di San Luca. He was made a knight of the Order of St. Sylvester and of the Order of Christ. In 1855 the municipality of Rome awarded him a gold medal, for his work during the third cholera pandemic.
