= Mattia de Rossi =

Italian architect (1637–1695)

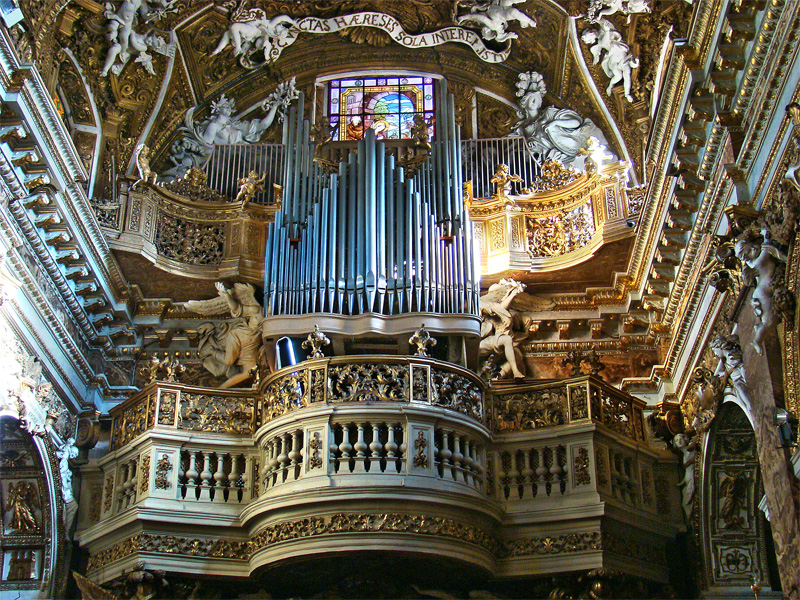
Cantoria (choir balcony) of the church Santa Maria della Vittoria, decorated by Mattia de Rossi

Mattia de Rossi (14 January 1637 – 2 August 1695) was an Italian architect of the Baroque period, active mainly in Rome and surrounding towns.

== Biography ==
Born in Rome to a family of architects and artisans, he rose to prominence under the mentorship of Gian Lorenzo Bernini, and even inherited the position as chief architect of the Fabbrica di San Pietro (workshop of St. Peter's Basilica) in 1680 after the master died. In that post, he continued the work that had been started by Bernini on the outside colonnade and the Ponte Sant’Angelo.

He worked during a period with notable competitors, including the prolific Carlo Fontana. Among his works are the facades of the churches of Santa Galla and San Francesco a Ripa (built 1681–1701); finishing touches or reconstruction for Sant'Andrea al Quirinale, Santa Maria in Montesanto, and Santa Croce e San Bonaventura dei Lucchesi; the customs office in Ripa Grande; the Palazzo Muti Papazzurri (attributed, 1660); the tomb monument to Giovanna Garzoni in Santi Luca e Martina; the Mausoleum of Leo X; and the monument to Clement X in St. Peter's Basilica. This latter funereal monument was designed by de Rossi, but the sculptures were completed by Lazzaro Morelli, Ercole Ferrata and Giuseppe Mazzuoli.

He was Principe or director of the Accademia di San Luca in 1681 and 1690–1693, when he was replaced by Carlo Fontana.

One new attribution is the design, perhaps along with Bernini, of the centralized church and complex of San Bonaventura at Monterano (1677), which, even in its present ruined state, recalls other mountain-top sanctuary churches in Italy. The buildings were commissioned by the Principe Don Angelo Altieri, nephew of Pope Clement X, who had just acquired the surrounding estate. It was for the Padri delle Scuole Pie, a group of priests engaged in education.

In 1683 de Rossi worked for Camillo Pamphilj in Valmontone, a little town not far from Rome. Here he planned the new main church, the Collegiata, or Church of Saint Mary, inspired by the church of Sant'Agnese in Agone by Borromini (Rome) and the Church of the Assunta in Ariccia, by Bernini.

In 1685 de' Rossi decorated on behalf of Cardinal Raimondo Capizucchi the chapel of San Paolo in the church of Santa Maria in Campitelli.

== Bibliography ==
- Hager, Hellmut (1978). "Bernini, Mattia de Rossi and the Church of S. Bonaventura at Monterano". Architectural History. 21: 68–78, 108–117. doi:10.2307/1568360.
- Menichella, Anna (1991). "DE' ROSSI, Matthia". Dizionario Biografico degli Italiani (in Italian). Vol. 39: Deodato–Di Falco. Rome: Institute of the Italian Encyclopaedia. ISBN 978-88-12-00032-6.
