= Palazzo Muti Papazzurri =

Coordinates: 41.8988°N 12.4838°E

- Palazzo Muti Papazzurri in 2010.
- Interactive map of the Palazzo Muti Papazzurri area

General information
- Architectural style: Baroque
- Location: Rome, Italy

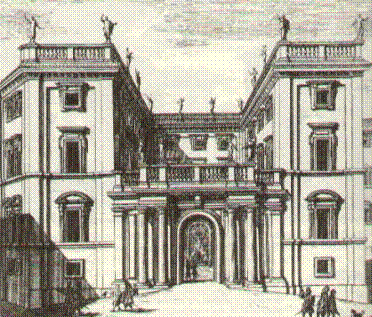
Palazzo Muti Papazzurri in 1699.

Palazzo Muti Papazzurri is a Baroque palazzo in Rome, Italy. It was built in 1660 by the architect Mattia de' Rossi, a pupil of Gian Lorenzo Bernini.

It is thought it was constructed for the newly married Pompeo Muti Papazzurri and Maria Isabella Massimo. A print of 1699 shows a large townhouse built around an open cour d'honneur, the court being entered through a triumphal arch at the centre of a Baroque screen linking the two flanking wings. The screen still remains but has today had rooms built above it, thus completely altering the open appearance of the palazzo to a plain closed façade.

During the 18th century the palazzo formed the centre of a family complex of properties which were rented in their entirety to the Stuarts, pretenders to the British throne; thus for a time the palazzo was the home of a court in exile.

In 1909 the palazzo was heavily restored which has changed de' Rossi's architectural concept of the original design by removing the pediments to the windows and the statuary decorating the roofline.

The 17th and 18th century interior decoration of the palazzo has been preserved complete with their frescoed ceilings. The gallery, one of the principal reception rooms, has frescos depicting scenes from classical mythology attributed to Giovanni Francesco Grimaldi and Niccolò Berrettoni. Grimaldi was one of the most fashionable painters of his day having worked extensively for Cardinal Mazarin.

Today the palazzo houses the Pontifical Biblical Institute.
