= Palazzo Skanderbeg =

Coordinates: 41°54′03″N 12°29′06″E

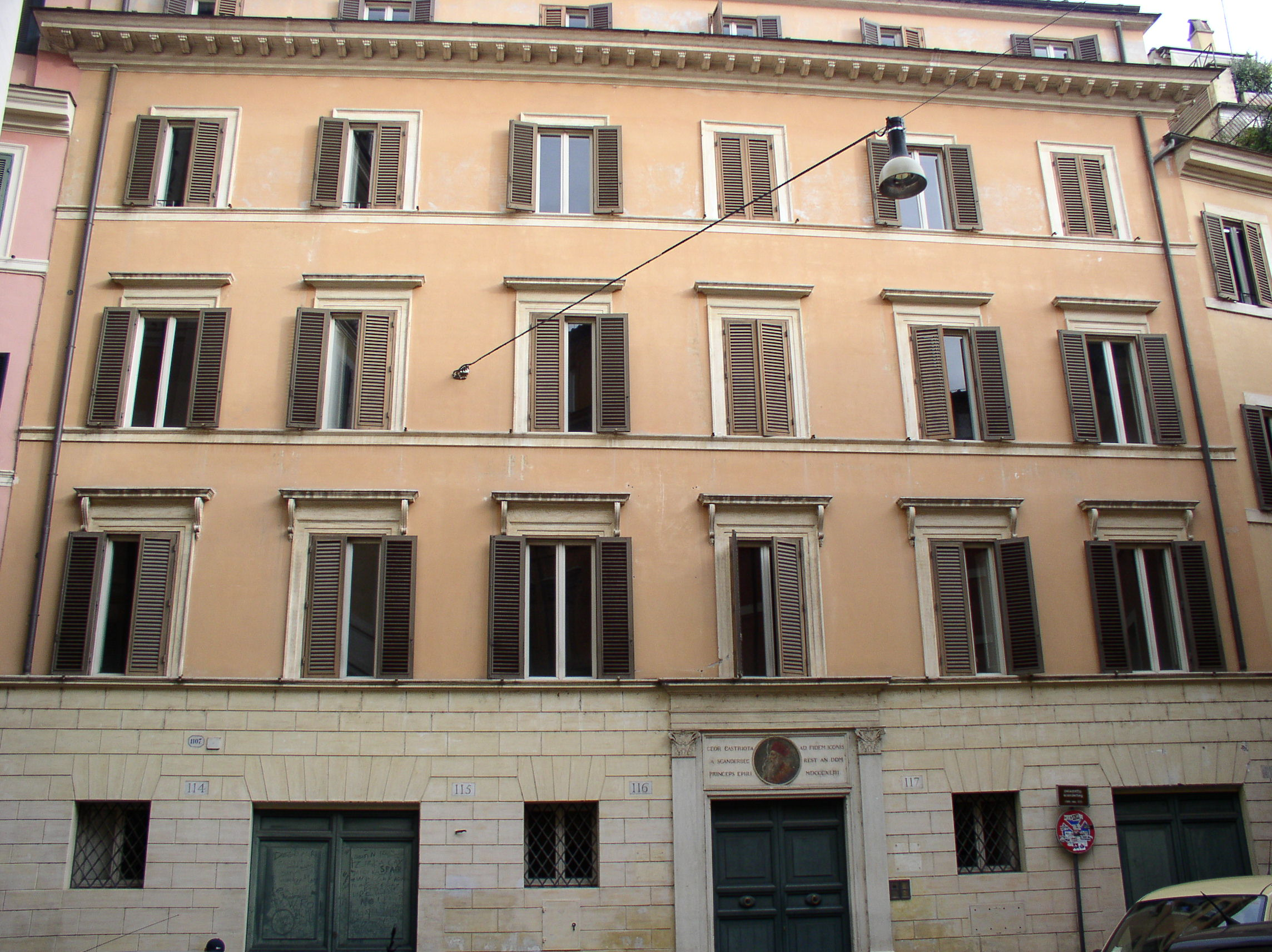
- Palazzo Skanderbeg
- Interactive map of Palazzo Skanderbeg

General information
- Location: Rome, Italy

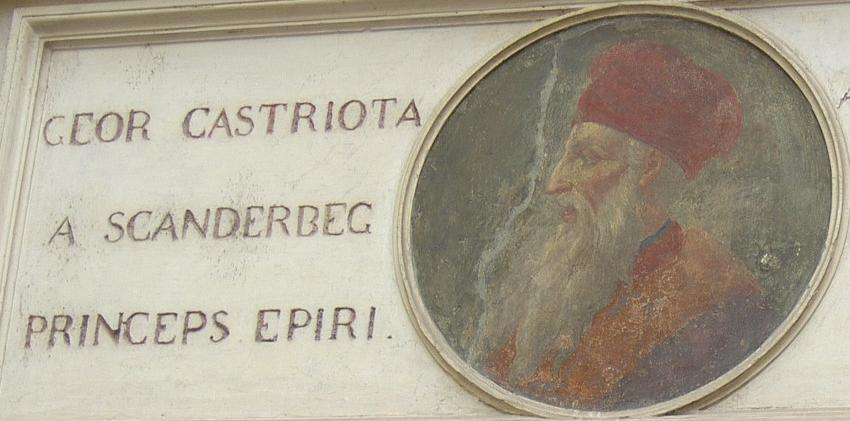
The murale of Skanderbeg in Piazza Scanderbeg in Rome, Italy

Palazzo Scanderbeg or Palazzetto Scanderbeg is a Roman palazzo, located on the Piazza Scanderbeg (Num. 117) near the Trevi Fountain. It takes its name from its fifteenth-century host, the Albanian national hero Skanderbeg. The Palazzo formerly housed the National Museum of Pasta Foods (Museo Nazionale delle Paste Alimentari). It has recently re-opened as a residence - Palazzo Scanderbeg Townhouse and Palazzo Scanderbeg Suites.
