= Piazza Scanderbeg =

Square in Rome

- City square
- {{{other_names}}}
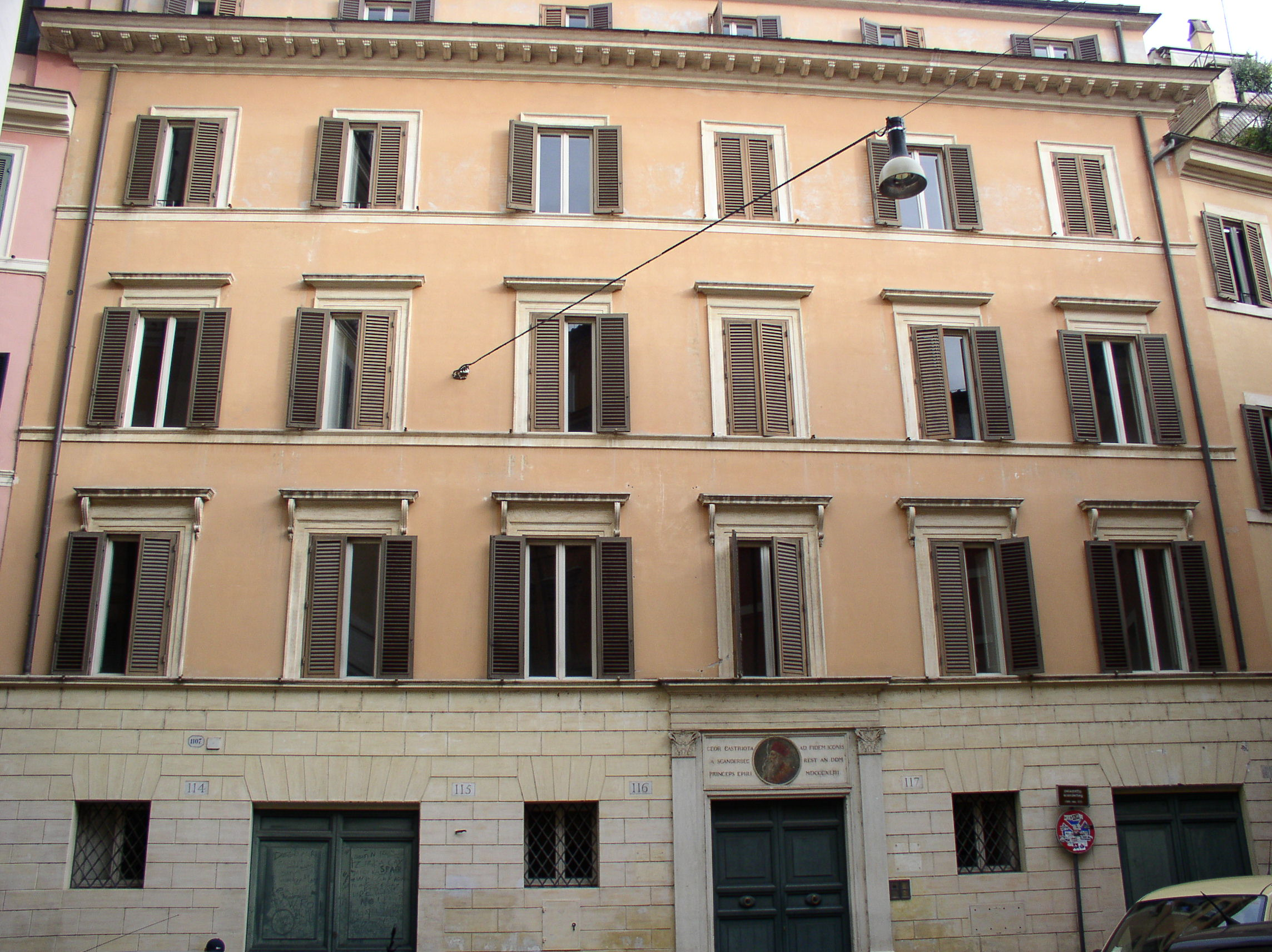
- Palazzo Skanderbeg in Piazza Scanderbeg
- Location: Rome, Italy
- Interactive map of Piazza Scanderbeg
- Coordinates: 41°54′2.4″N 12°29′5.4″E

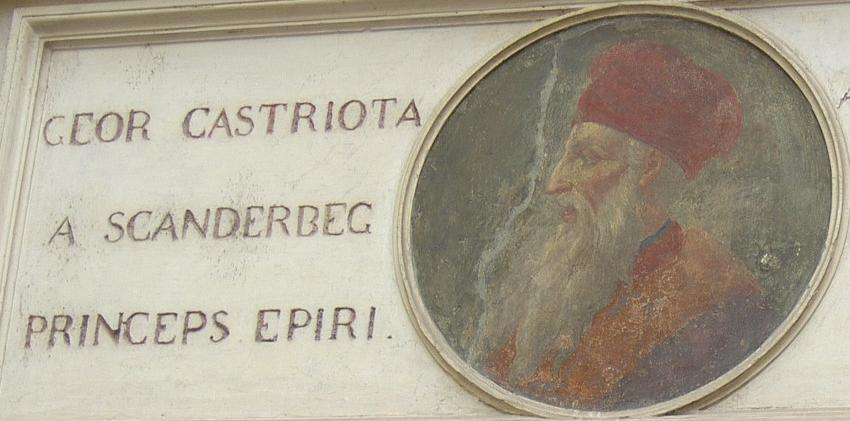
The murale of Skanderbeg on Palazzo Skanderbeg

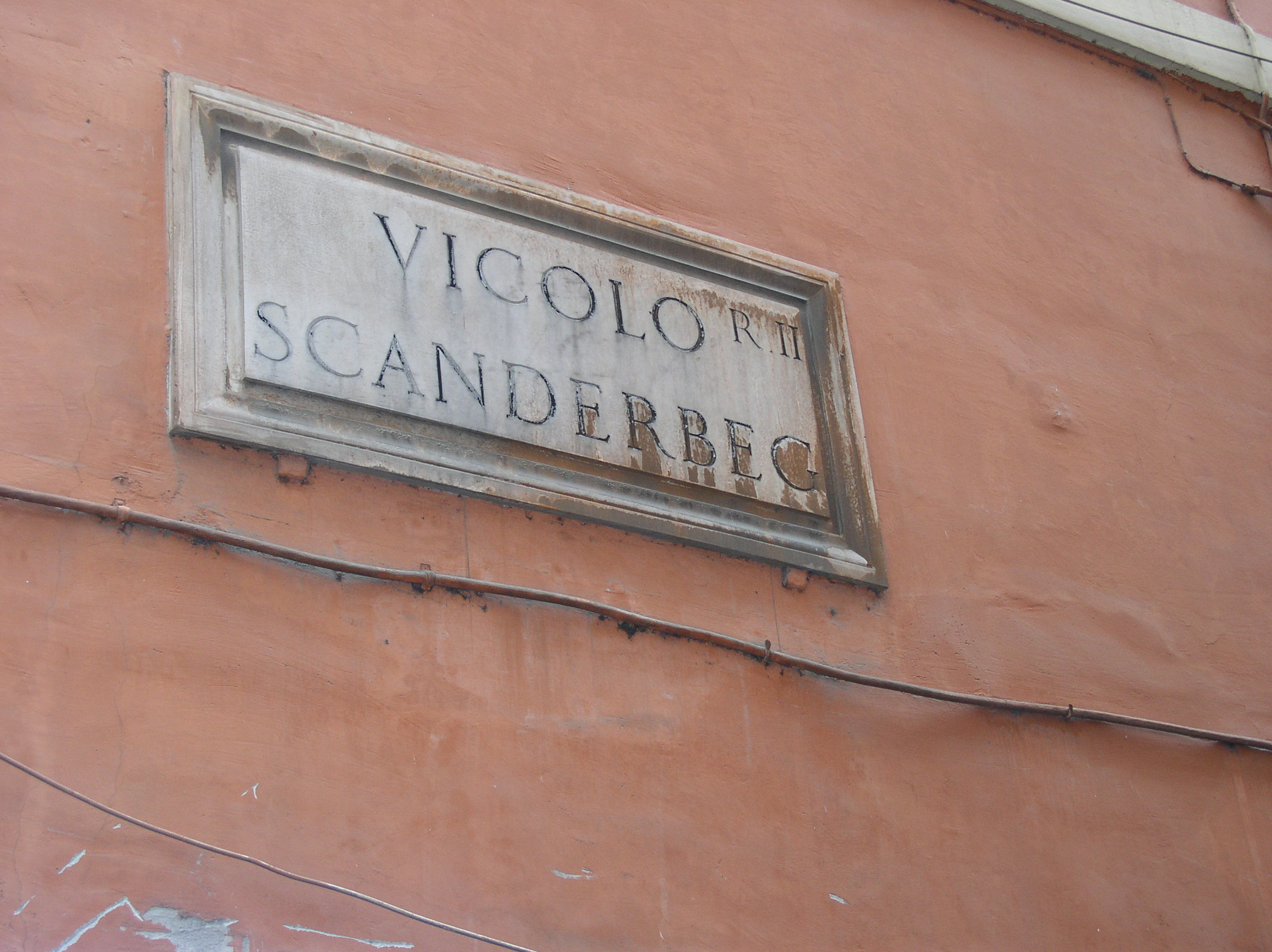
Vicolo Scanderbeg street in Rome is named after Skanderbeg

Piazza Scanderbeg is a square in Rome, Italy. It is located on the junction of Vicolo Scanderbeg and Via della Panetteria. It is named after the Albanian national hero Skanderbeg, who once lived in Palazzo Skanderbeg located on the square.

It was inaugurated by Benito Mussolini.
