= 2022 North Macedonia protests =

- Protesters in Skopje holding anti-EU and anti-Bulgarian posters and waving the controversial Kutlesh flag.
- Date: 2 July – 11 August 2022 (5 weeks and 5 days)
- Location: Skopje, (Note: A demonstration march was also held in Kumanovo.) North Macedonia
- Caused by: Bulgaria–North Macedonia bilateral issues; Rejection of the French proposal by the opposition parties in North Macedonia; Anti-Bulgarian sentiment in North Macedonia; Euroscepticism in North Macedonia
- Goals: Convince the Government of North Macedonia to reject the French proposal.
- Result: French proposal approved by the Assembly of North Macedonia.

Parties
| (Socialist Republic of Macedonia) / (North Macedonia) Revolted citizens and opposition parties, including: VMRO-DPMNE; The Left; DPSM | Government of North Macedonia; SDSM |

Casualties
- Injuries: 10 protesters; 54 policemen
- Charged: 23 (Per the Ministry of Internal Affairs of North Macedonia)

In early July 2022, protests began in Skopje, North Macedonia. The protests were triggered by Bulgaria–North Macedonia negotiations surrounding the accession of the latter into the European Union.

== Background ==
North Macedonia (then named Macedonia) has been a candidate to join the European Union (EU) since 2005. The use of the country name "Macedonia" was the object of a dispute with neighbouring Greece between 1991 and 2019, resulting in a Greek veto against EU and NATO accession talks, which lasted from 2008 to 2019. After the issue was resolved with the 2018 Prespa Agreement, the EU gave its formal approval to begin accession talks in March 2020. However, in November 2020, Bulgaria refused to approve the European Union's negotiation framework for North Macedonia, thereby blocking the start of the country's negotiations with the EU, having prior made demands for North Macedonia to fulfil the 2017 Bulgarian-Macedonian Friendship Treaty. The conclusion of the treaty played a decisive role in Bulgaria's agreement to approve North Macedonia's NATO candidacy, and its implementation is considered by it a key to the negotiation process with the EU. North Macedonia and Bulgaria have very complicated relations, and the Bulgarian factor is known in Macedonian politics as "B-complex". According to the official Bulgarian position, it cannot "accept that the still ongoing nation-building process in the Republic of North Macedonia be conducted through the revision of our common history, the denial of our common ethnic and linguistic roots or the unfounded claims for the existence of a ‘Macedonian minority’ in Bulgaria."

In June 2022, France, at the end of its rotating Presidency of the Council of the European Union, sent a proposal (known as the French proposal) for the EU negotiation framework of North Macedonia, as well as to serve as a compromise deal between North Macedonia and Bulgaria.

== French proposal ==
The proposal includes the condition to stop "hate speech" against all "minorities and communities", and that North Macedonia respect the 2017 Friendship Treaty with Bulgaria. On 24 June, after heated discussions, the Bulgarian parliament had already approved this proposal. The ruling political coalition parties in North Macedonia accepted the agreement. North Macedonia's President Pendarovski and the Social Democrat-led government backed the proposed deal too. Its opponents in North Macedonia said that it threatens the country's national identity and makes too many concessions to Bulgaria by claiming the country's language and ethnicity have Bulgarian roots. The supporters of the proposal said it does not contradict the national interest or North Macedonia's identity. According to a survey by the Institute for Political Research from Skopje in July 2022, 72,80% of ethnic Macedonians and 56% of the total number of respondents answered that they would not accept the beginning of negotiations with the EU, at the price of the country agreeing to the proposal.

Former European Union Special Representative Erwan Fouéré criticized the "French proposal" for allegedly incorporating bilateral issues into the accession process. According to him, Bulgaria insists on imposing its own version of events during and after the World War II, and that the proposal undermines the EU's entire accession process. Political scientist Florian Bieber described it as a "disaster for EU enlargement". According to him, the "French proposal" will encourage extreme nationalists and increase inter-ethnic tensions. He also pointed out the "double standards" with Bulgaria in relation to the treatment of its ethnic Macedonian minority and criticized Bulgaria for insisting that nothing in the accession process can be interpreted as a recognition of the existence of the Macedonian language. According to him, the proposal sets a "dangerous precedent", by accepting bilateral issues in the EU enlargement process and would encourage revisionist nationalist bullying by more powerful neighbours against those outside the EU. Austrian historian Ulf Brunnbauer has similar objections in his criticism of the proposal.

The first foreign minister of the then Republic of Macedonia and professor of international law, Denko Maleski, said that the proposal should be supported and that it can unite North Macedonia and Bulgaria into finding a solution, stressing the importance of France in resolving the problem. According to Macedonian intellectual Katerina Kolozova, the proposal does not threaten Macedonian identity and language. She also criticised the opposition for what she described as "... the opposition's disinformation campaign against the document succeeded in drawing in supposedly “neutral” and pro-Western civil society organisations, which also raised the banners of “NO to [this] EU” and “NO to an EU that wants to render us Bulgarian”."

== Protests ==
The protests, which started on 2 July, were organized by some nationalist and leftist parties, primarily VMRO-DPMNE, its coalition Renewal, Levica, Democratic Party of Serbs in Macedonia and others. They rejected the EU's proposal to approve the country's negotiating framework, also known as the French proposal. The protesters rallied under the slogan "Ultimatum, No Thanks!" They also carried posters with inscriptions: "Fuck the EU" and "Bulgarian fascism - European value".

On 4 July, Macedonian singer Lambe Alabakovski symbolically burned the 2017 Treaty of Friendship, Good Neighborliness and Cooperation with Bulgaria, the 2018 Prespa agreement with Greece and the so-called French proposal for the start of North Macedonia's negotiation process with the EU, calling these documents fascist. Alabakovski was arrested a month earlier by the police in Bitola in connection with a fire at the Bulgarian cultural center in the city. The European flag was set on fire in one instance by activists of minor pro-Russian party Rodina Makedonija. The protesters chanted "Resignation", "Never North, just Macedonia", "ASNOM lives", "Bulgarian fascists" and sang patriotic songs.

On 5 July, 47 policemen were injured. Protesters threw various items at the parliament building, government building and the building of the Ministry of Internal Affairs in Skopje. Offensive and even vulgar chants against the European Union and Bulgaria were heard during the protests. Slogans were raised that Bulgaria is a "fascist state" and the EU is a "fascist union". Protesters in Skopje carried the former national flag with the Star of Vergina, abandoned under Greek pressure, because of its relation to the controversial antiquization nation building policy, as well as red flags with communist symbols. Violence escalated further when small groups of ethnic Macedonians and Albanians, clashed in the centre of Skopje, at the Skanderbeg Square. During the clash, demonstrators threw rocks and hard objects, and one armed person was present, with shots being fired into the air. The armed person was later apprehended by the police. On 7 July, the "Albanian Alliance" announced the ending of its partnership with VMRO-DPMNE.

On 14 July, thousands of protesters protested in front of the parliament, while the French proposal was being discussed. President of the European Commission Ursula von der Leyen came to address the parliament, where she was met with whistles and jeers from the opposition MPs. The opposition MPs wore t-shirts with the word "no" written on them in red and held up banners against the French proposal. At one point, MP Apasiev served von der Leyen a pamphlet with a large "NO" written on it. Prime Minister Dimitar Kovačevski also addressed the parliament and asked the MPs to accept the deal, while the opposition MPs protested. During the same day, a demonstration march was led by Kumanovo Municipality Mayor Maksim Dimitrievski in Kumanovo. On the next day an opposition lawmaker compared von der Leyen's visit to the Nazis' activity related to the Law for the Prevention of Hereditarily Diseased Offspring, which was condemned by SDSM and the Democratic Union for Integration. VMRO-DPMNE also threatened that Prime Minister Kovačevski will be in prison for what he is doing to (North) Macedonia and its people. On 16 July, the former Foreign Minister from VMRO-DPMNE Antonio Milošoski accused the ruling Social Democrats of treason. A deputy of the SDSM, asked him "who are you to call us traitors, you who has several passports in your pocket", alluding to the claims that he has Bulgarian citizenship, as many other Macedonians. At the end of the same session, with 68 "yes" votes, the parliament approved draft conclusions, giving the government a mandate to negotiate within the so-called "French proposal".

On 17 July, North Macedonia signed a special protocol with Bulgaria to cooperate on the subjects of including Bulgarians and other nations in the country's constitution, combatting hate speech, revising school textbooks etc. Several protests occurred after the adoption of the French proposal. On 28 July, a demonstration was organized in front of the Bulgarian embassy with placards reading "No to the EU", "We don't need Europe", "No to Bulgarian blackmail", protesters chanting "Bulgarian fascists", and a speaker stating that "Bulgaria is the most Nazi country in EU", the demonstrators painted the Star of Vergina on the street in front of the embassy. Two more protests were organized in front of the embassy again in August with a low turnout.

== Reactions ==
=== Government of North Macedonia ===
Prime Minister Dimitar Kovačevski and others condemned the violence which occurred during the protests. The government of North Macedonia and its coalition partners have insisted the protests' organizers are anti-European and pro-Russian elements. Per the Foreign Minister Bujar Osmani, if the French proposal would be declined, inter-ethnic tensions will start in the country. Osmani, who is a Macedonian Albanian, also appealed to put an end to the hatred against Bulgaria. President Pendarovski made a statement that Russian spies from a neighboring country were infiltrating North Macedonia. Pendarovski also claimed that these agents were involved in the protests. According to him, Russia finances the opposition in the country.

=== North Macedonia protest supporters, opposition parties and intellectuals ===
On 30 June, Mickoski claimed that the negotiations will not be per the Copenhagen accession criteria with the "French proposal". In the same interview to Serbian media in which he stated that he would not support the French proposal, which according to him was "pro-Bulgarian". On 16 July, after the parliament approved the so-called "French proposal", Mickoski stated that the opposition was yet to block the negotiation process. He announced that it would not allow the inclusion of Bulgarians in the constitution, for which a qualified majority is required. This is a condition without which at some future point the negotiations process will be suspended.

The leader of the "Levica" party Dimitar Apasiev stated that there are alternatives to the EU, one of which is the "Serbian example".

On 12 July, 800 intellectuals from North Macedonia signed a manifesto which stated that by accepting the French proposal, the Macedonian people and language will be bulgarised and become a rootless tree, reduced to an artificial construction dating back to the end of the Second World War. "If this is the condition for entering the EU, then we say no", the address concluded.

=== Bulgarian views and reactions ===
Observers in Sofia have claimed these are sympathizers of anti-EU opposition parties with pro-Russian and pro-Serbian orientation, which are spreading anti-Bulgarian sentiments. The Bulgarian Foreign Minister Teodora Genchovska described the public reaction in North Macedonia against the French proposal to regulate relations between Sofia and Skopje as "quite worrying". On July 12, an association of the descendants of early 20th century refugees in Bulgaria, from what is today North Macedonia, sent an appeal to the European institutions with the request to put pressure on the country to start negotiations on joining the EU. According to the appeal, the reason for refusing to accept the French proposal was the lack of real decommunization in North Macedonia, more than 30 years after the fall of communism in Europe, which consequence today is the denial of their common cultural and historical heritage until 1945. On the same day, the Bulgarian Foreign Ministry sent an official note of protest against the numerous manifestations of hatred directed against Bulgaria. According to Bulgarian analyst Svetoslav Terziev, the protests in Skopje were about "Bulgarianophobia" encouraged by Moscow and Belgrade, "from which the Macedonians do not want to give up. It is the basis of their ethnic identity and the Macedonians are afraid that without it, they will cease to exist. In such case they do not need the EU. The battle in Skopje is as much against Bulgaria, as it is against Europe". Per Bulgarian archaeologist Nikolay Ovcharov, there was "fascism" on the streets of Skopje. According to Bulgarian analyst Nikolay Krastev, the protests were anti-European.

=== US and EU views and reactions ===
On 9 July, in a joint statement, the High Representative of the Union for Foreign Affairs and Security Policy Josep Borrell and the US Secretary of State Antony Blinken welcomed France's proposal as based on mutual respect, trust and understanding, calling for the necessary decision to be taken for the country to continue on its European path.

"The future of your country is in the European Union", wrote the President of the European Commission, Ursula von der Leyen, in a tweet in Macedonian language, after she visited Skopje on 14 July, during the visit she addressed the Parliament. Von der Leyen's message was met with negative reactions from Macedonian Twitter users. According to her, the acceptance of the French proposal will enable the unblocking of European integration and the opening of the first phase of the accession negotiations, which will represent a positive impulse for the reform process and the progress of North Macedonia. On 31 July, the EU Ambassador in Skopje, David Geer, warned that if the country does not change its constitution, the negotiation process will stop.

=== Albanian reactions ===
On 14 July, the Albanian Prime Minister Edi Rama announced that he would demand that Albania be separated in its European path from the Macedonian-Bulgarian dispute, if the French proposal does not receive a "positive answer" in Skopje.

== See also ==
- List of protests in the 21st century
- 2011 Macedonian protests
- 2015 Macedonian protests
- 2016 Macedonian protests
- 2017 storming of Macedonian Parliament
