= Skanderbeg Square, Pristina =

Public square in Pristina, Kosovo

Skanderbeg Square Sheshi Skënderbeu
- Public square
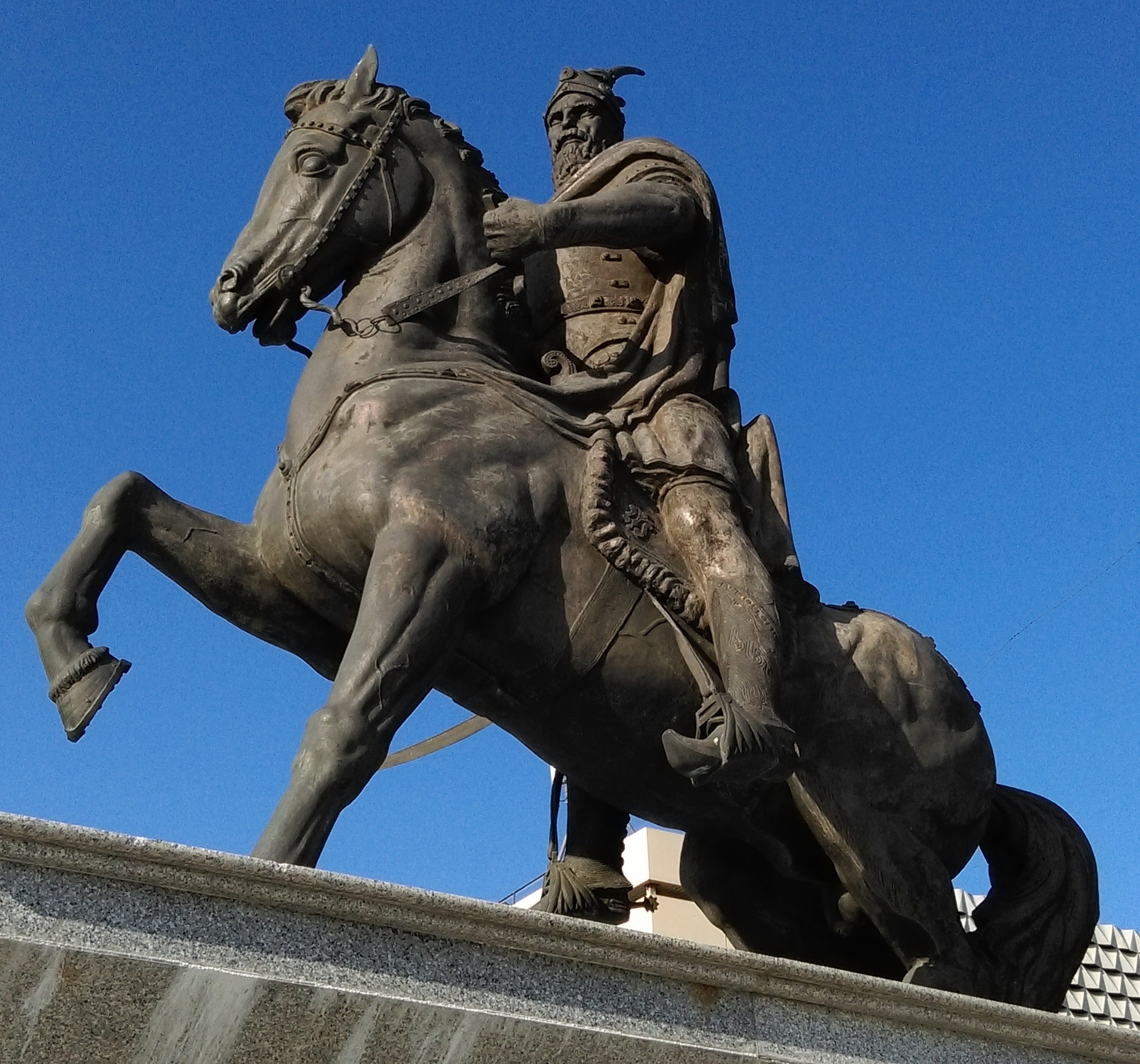
- Skanderbeg's statue in the square
- Owner: Pristina Municipality
- Location: Pristina, Kosovo
- Location within Kosovo
- Coordinates: 42°39′49″N 21°09′50″E

Skanderbeg Square (Albanian: Sheshi "Skënderbeu") is a square in Pristina, Kosovo.

== Location and history ==
Following the end of the Kosovo conflict in 1999 and no longer under Serbian rule, Kosovo Albanians in 2001 erected a monument within the centre of Pristina to Skanderbeg, a medieval Albanian who fought against Ottoman forces. Over a journey of four days the statue was brought from Krujë in Albania to the middle of Pristina. The Skanderbeg statue of Pristina shares a similar socialist aesthetic and equestrian posture with minor differences in detail to existing Skanderbeg monuments in Tirana, Skopje and other places in Europe. Skanderbeg is depicted on a horse with its right leg up in a menacing pose and his sword is outside of its sheath and pointed toward the ground. A war memorial dedicated to the victims of the Kosovo war is present in Skanderbeg square along with a series of photographs depicting the missing from the conflict. Skanderbeg Square is bordered on one side by Rugova Square, a space named after the first Kosovo President Ibrahim Rugova and on the other side by Mother Teresa Boulevard, named after Saint Teresa of Calcutta. Along with Tirana and Skopje, Pristina is one of three Balkan capitals to install a Skanderbeg statue.

== Gallery ==
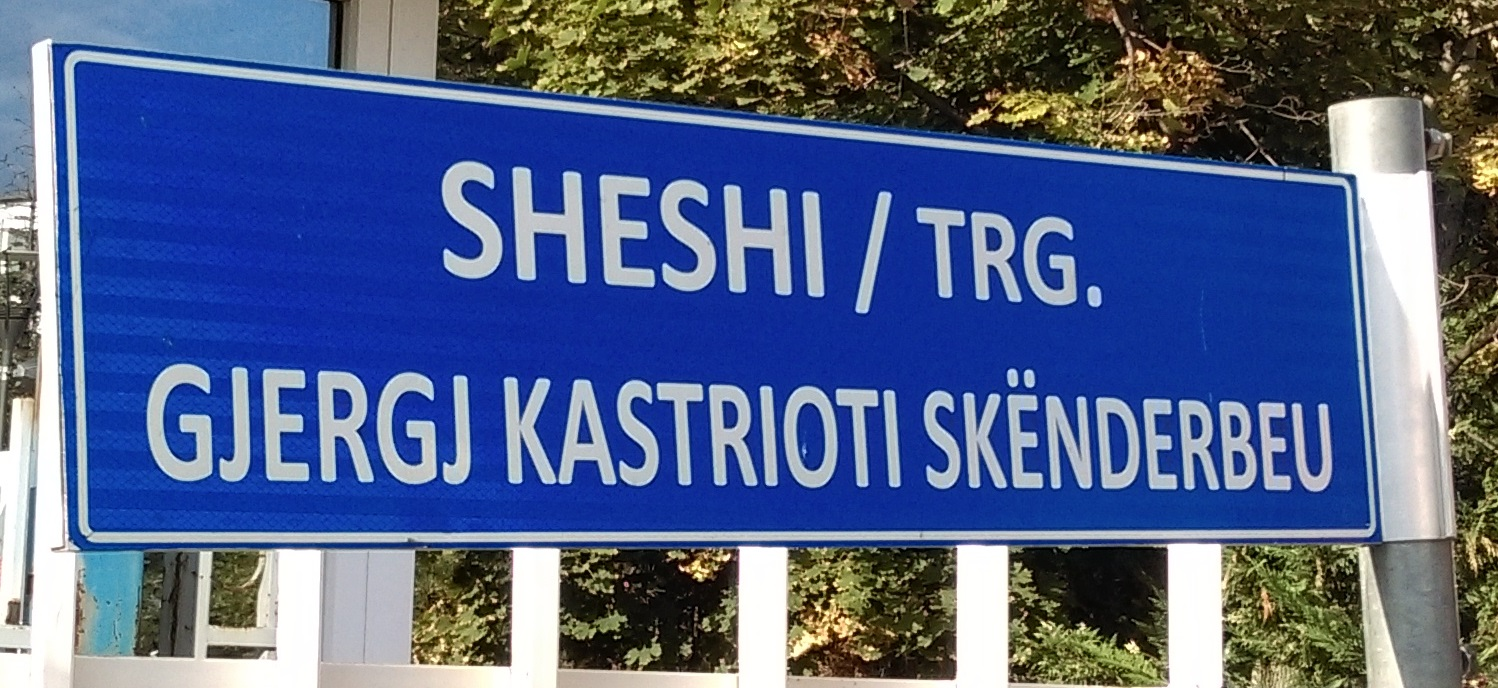
Bilingual sign designating Skanderbeg Square

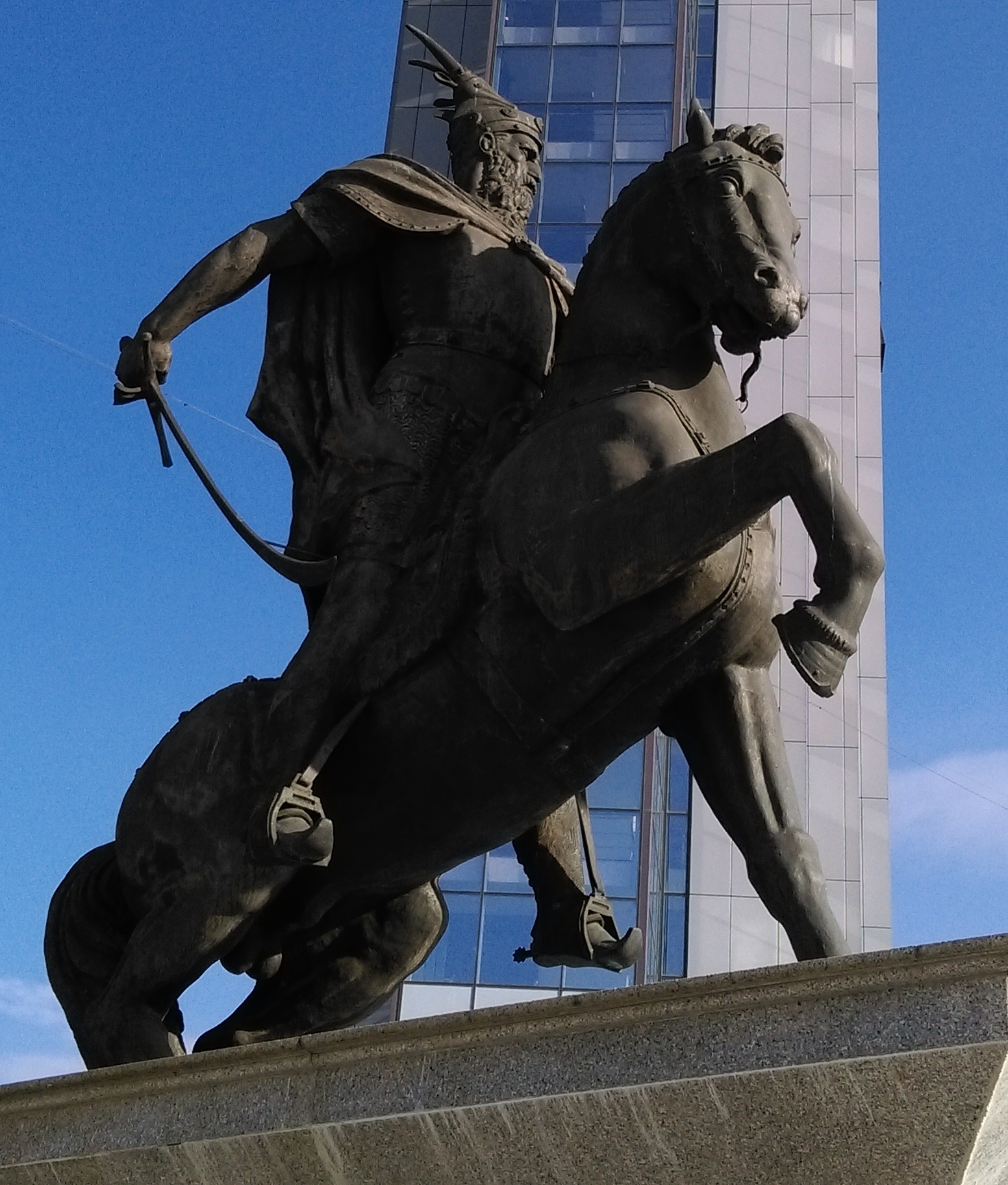
Skanderbeg statue

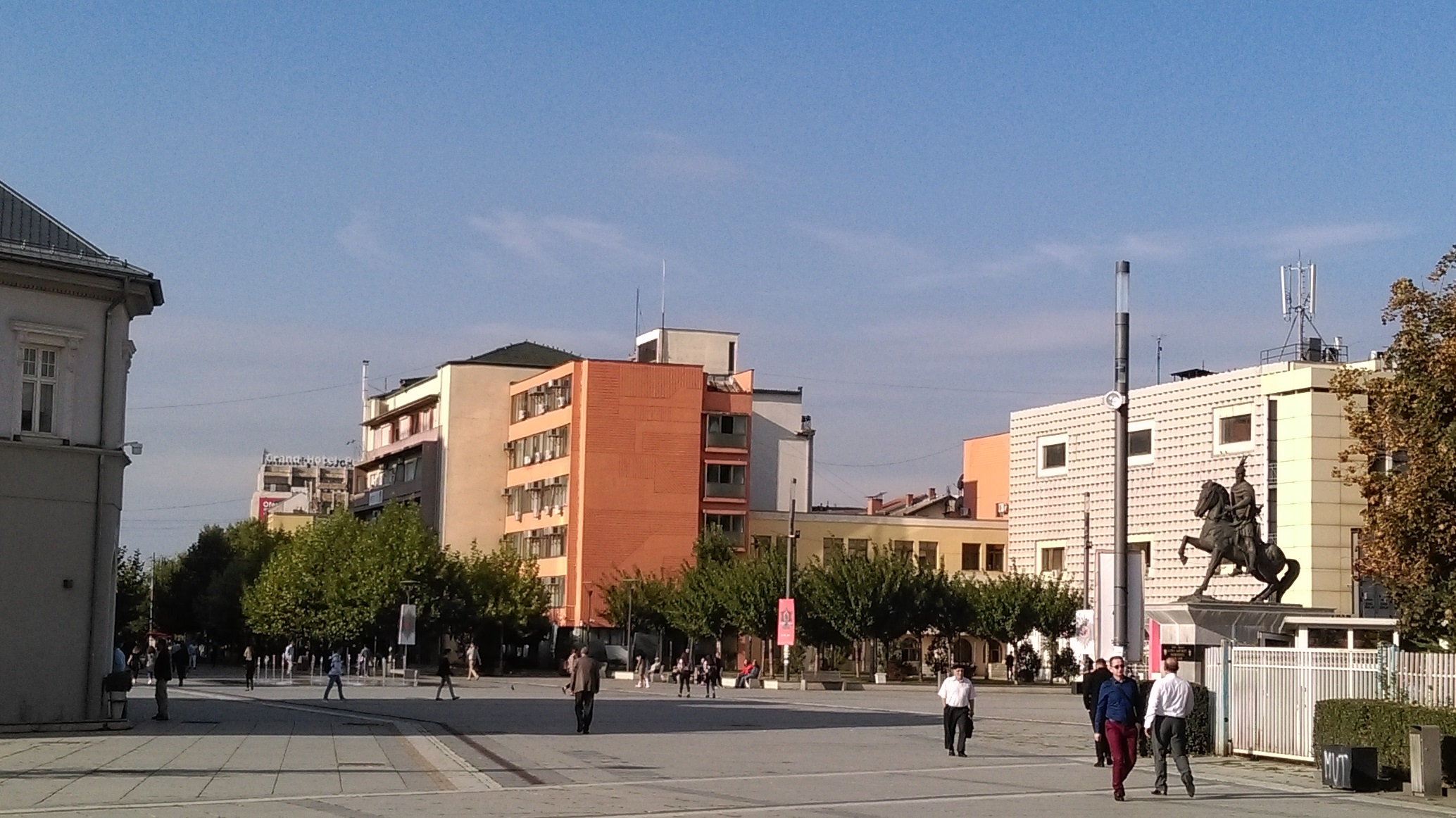
Skanderbeg Square

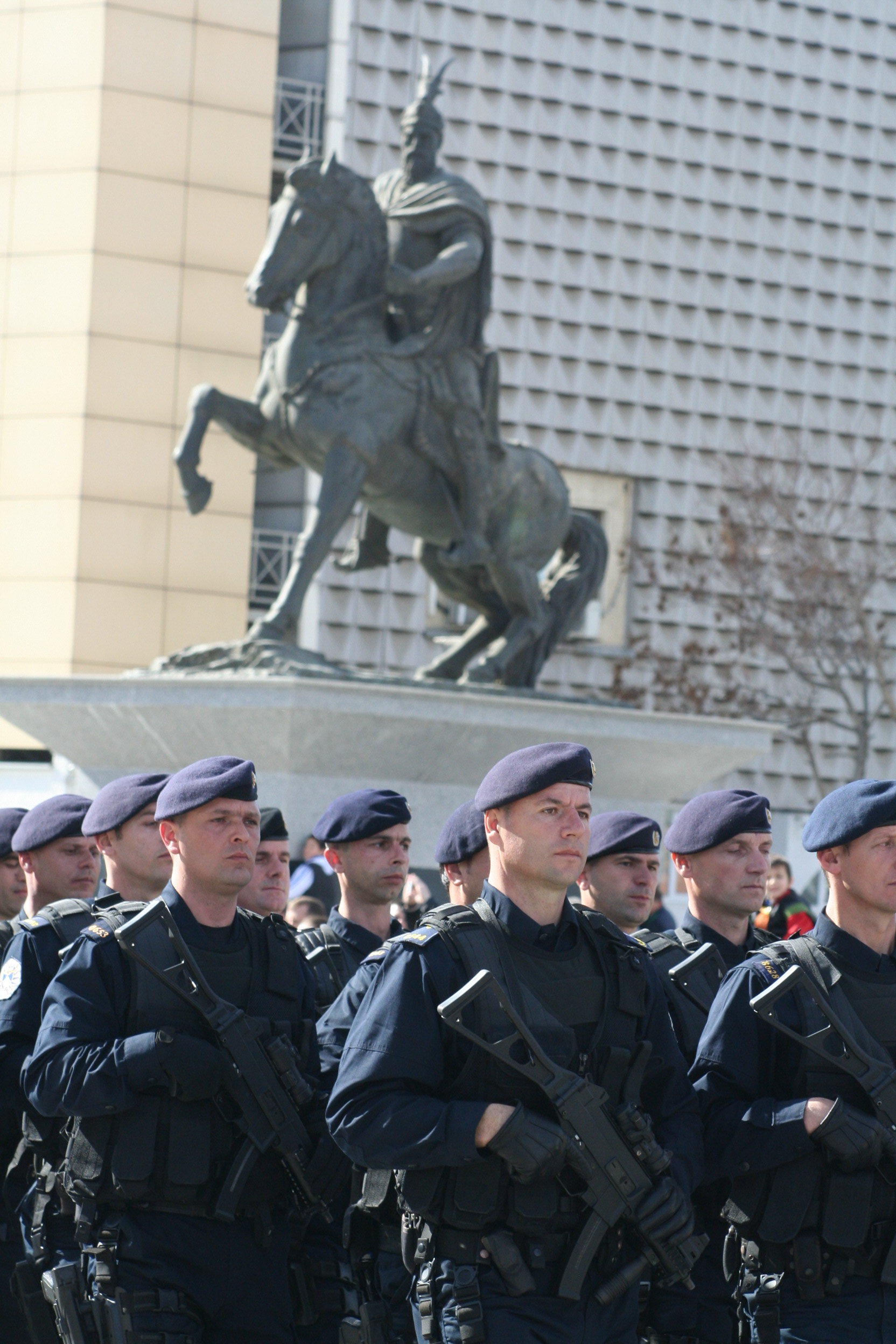
Parade by Kosovo Security Force in square

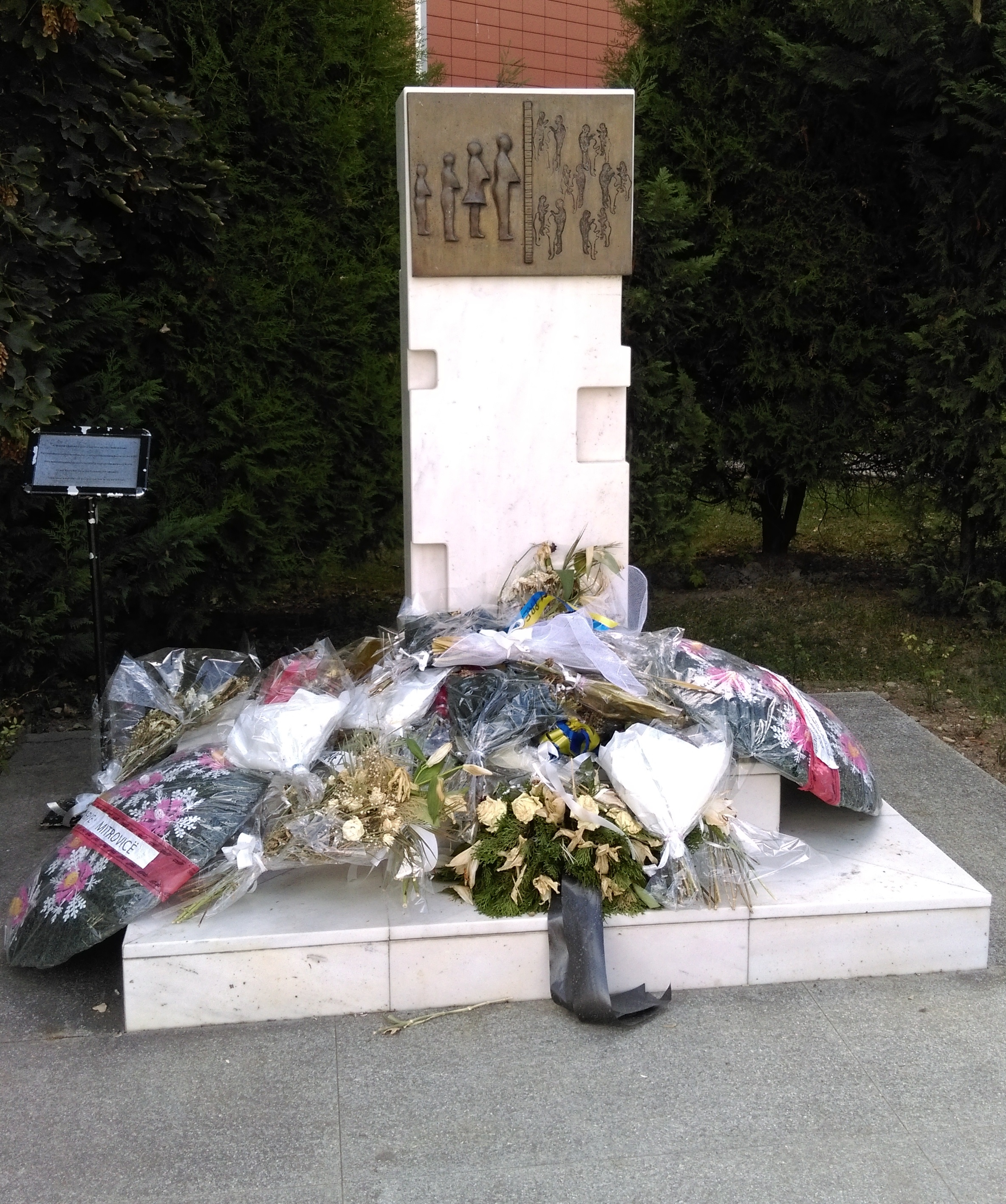
War memorial dedicated to the victims of the Kosovo war

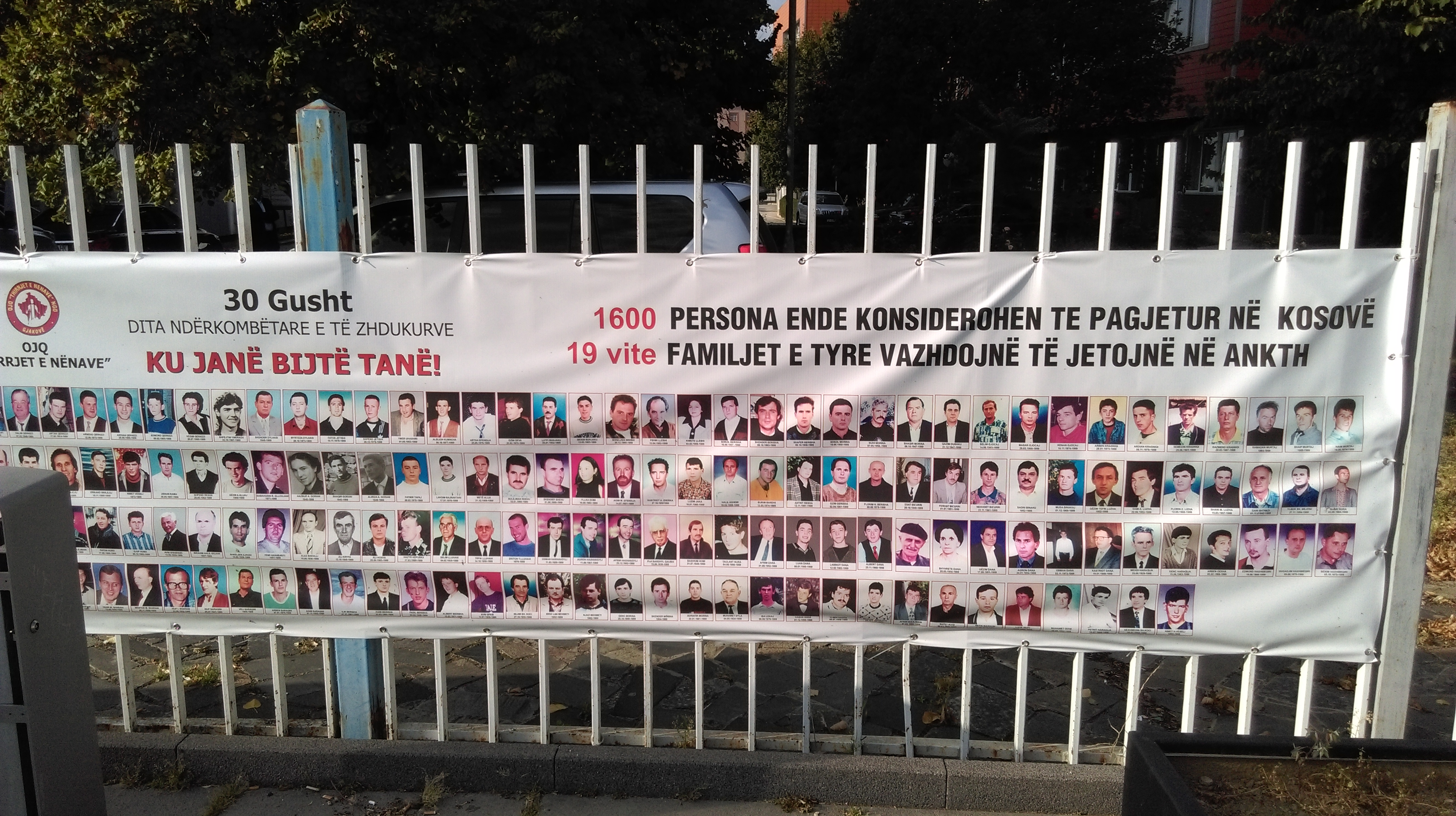
Banner with photographs depicting the missing from the conflict

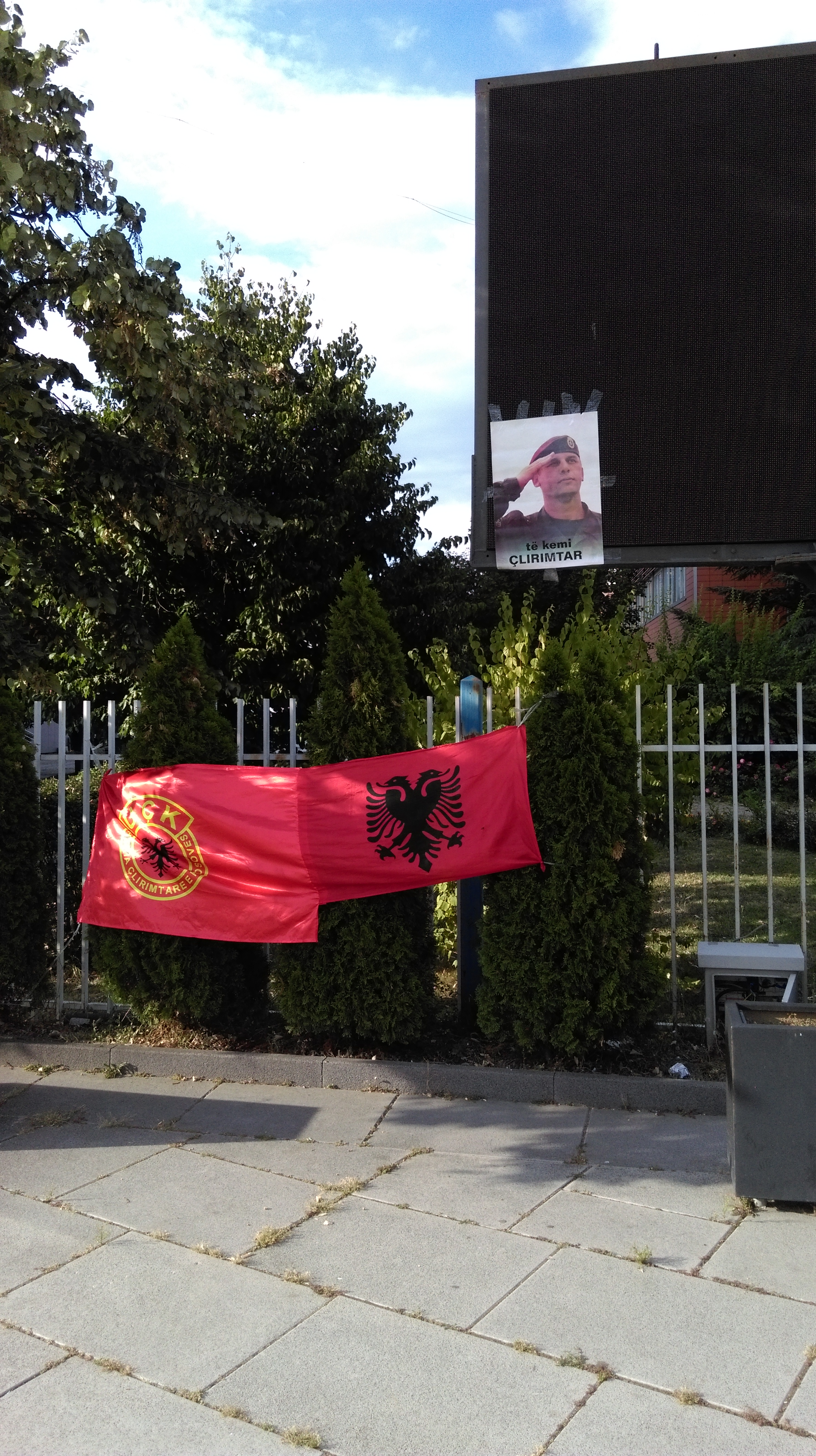
Banner and flags honouring the Kosovo Liberation Army

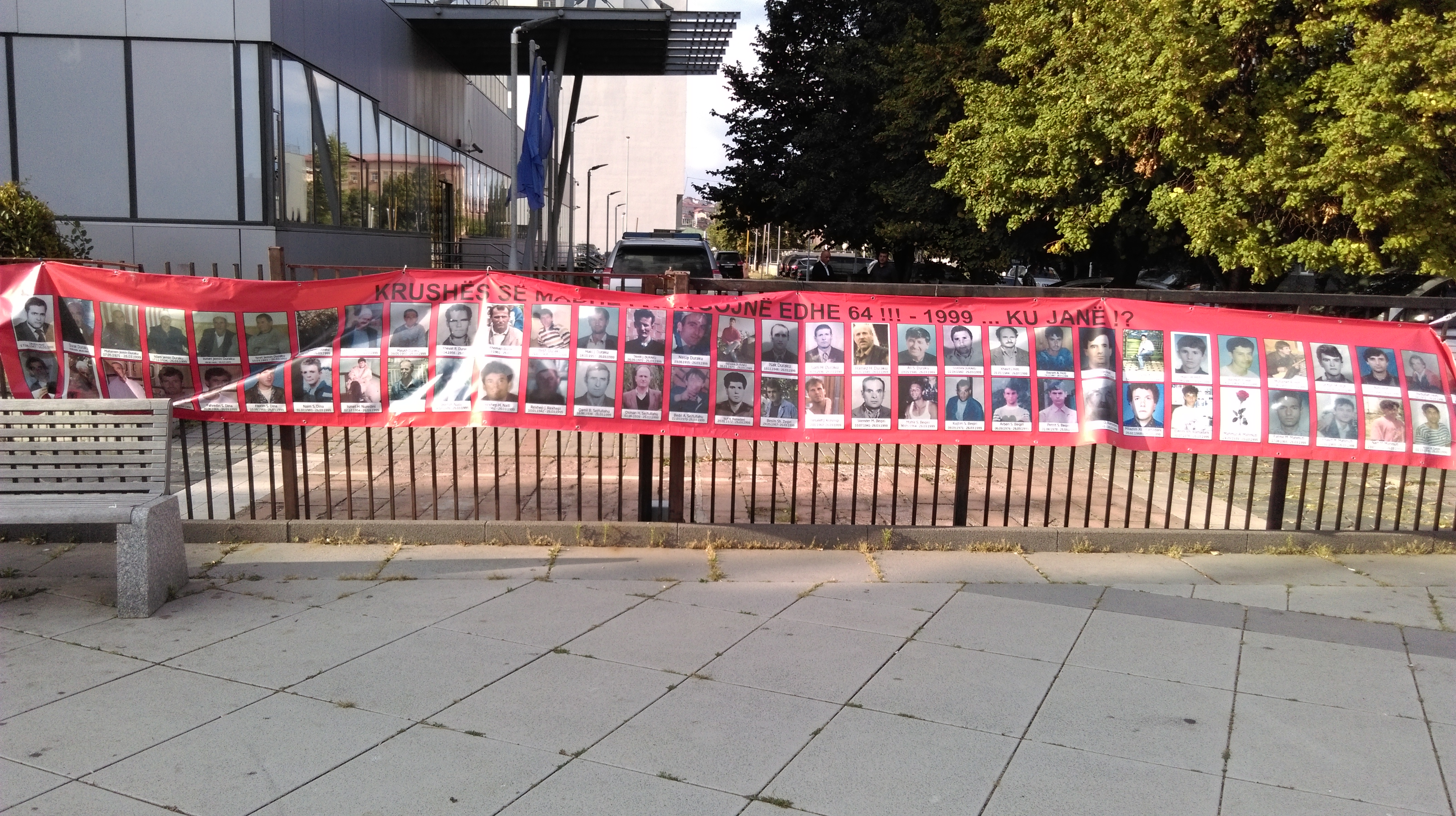
Banner with photographs depicting the missing from the conflict

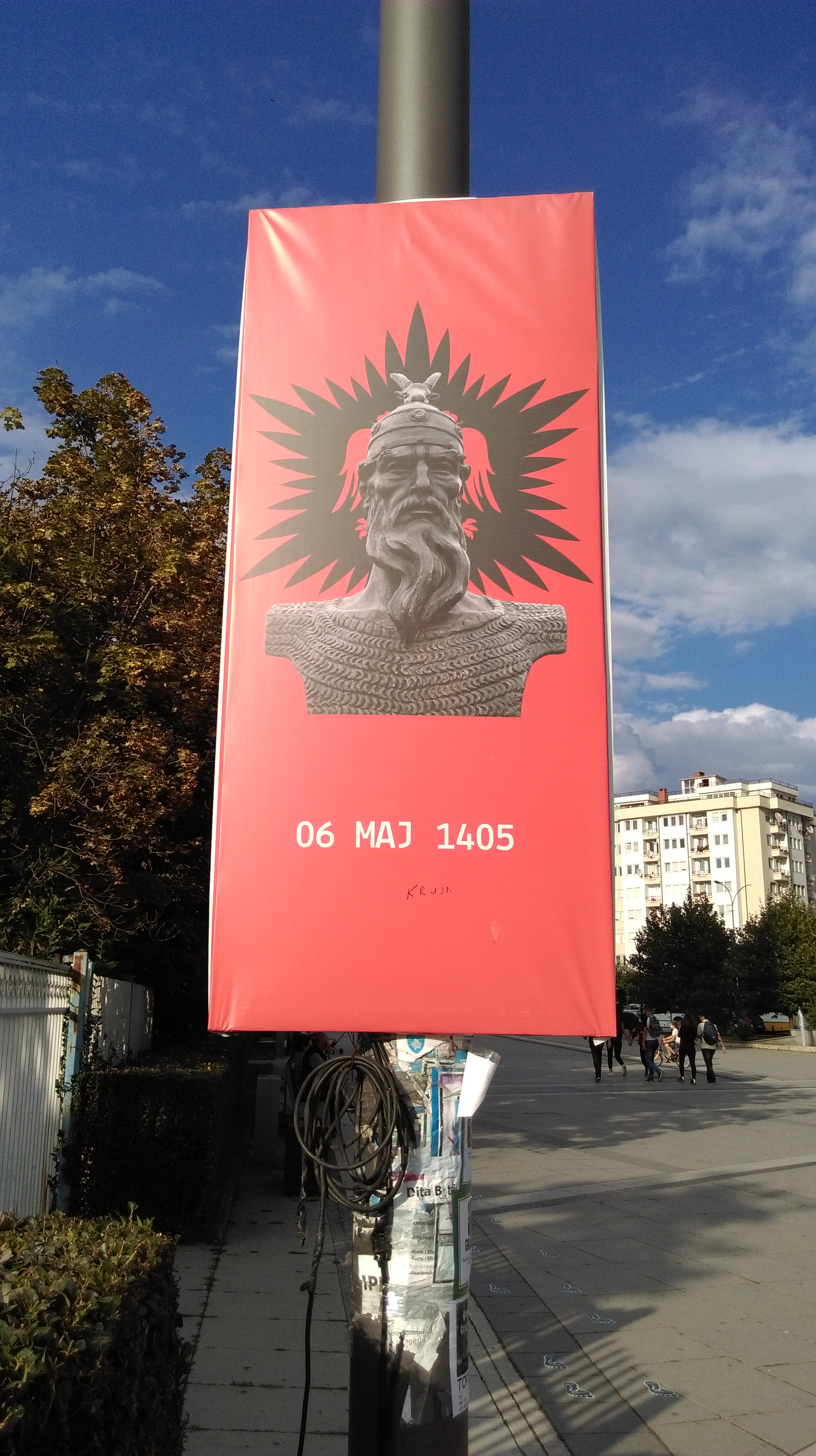
Poster of Skanderbeg in square

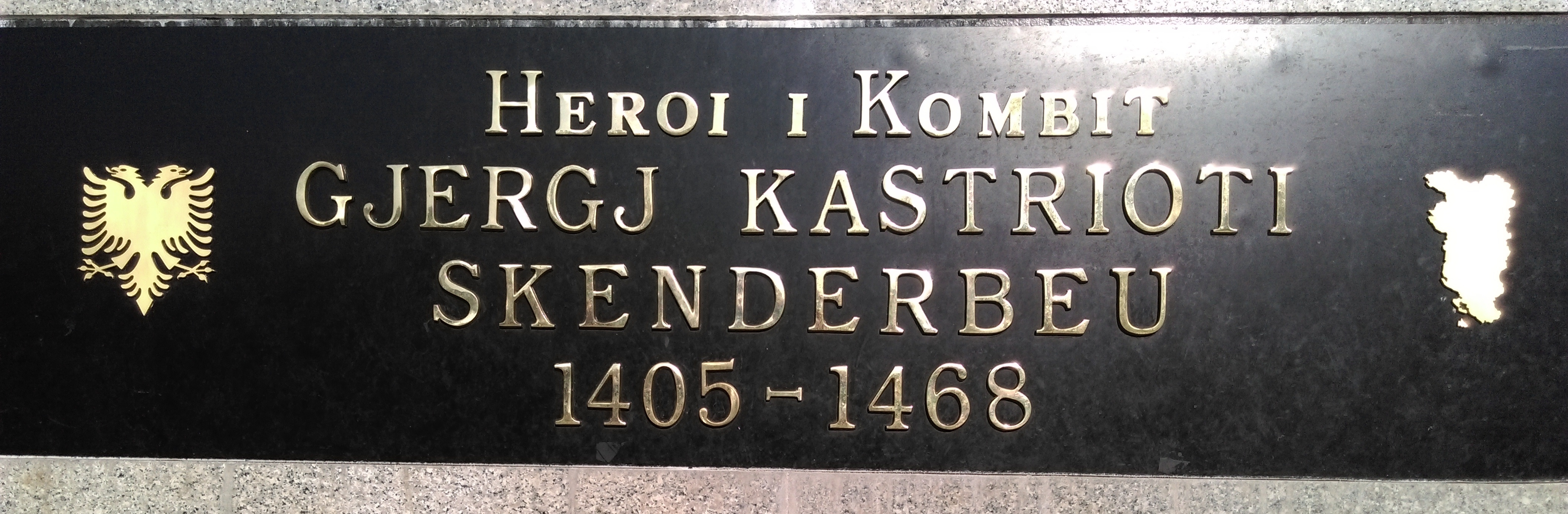
Pedestal plaque of the Skanderbeg statue

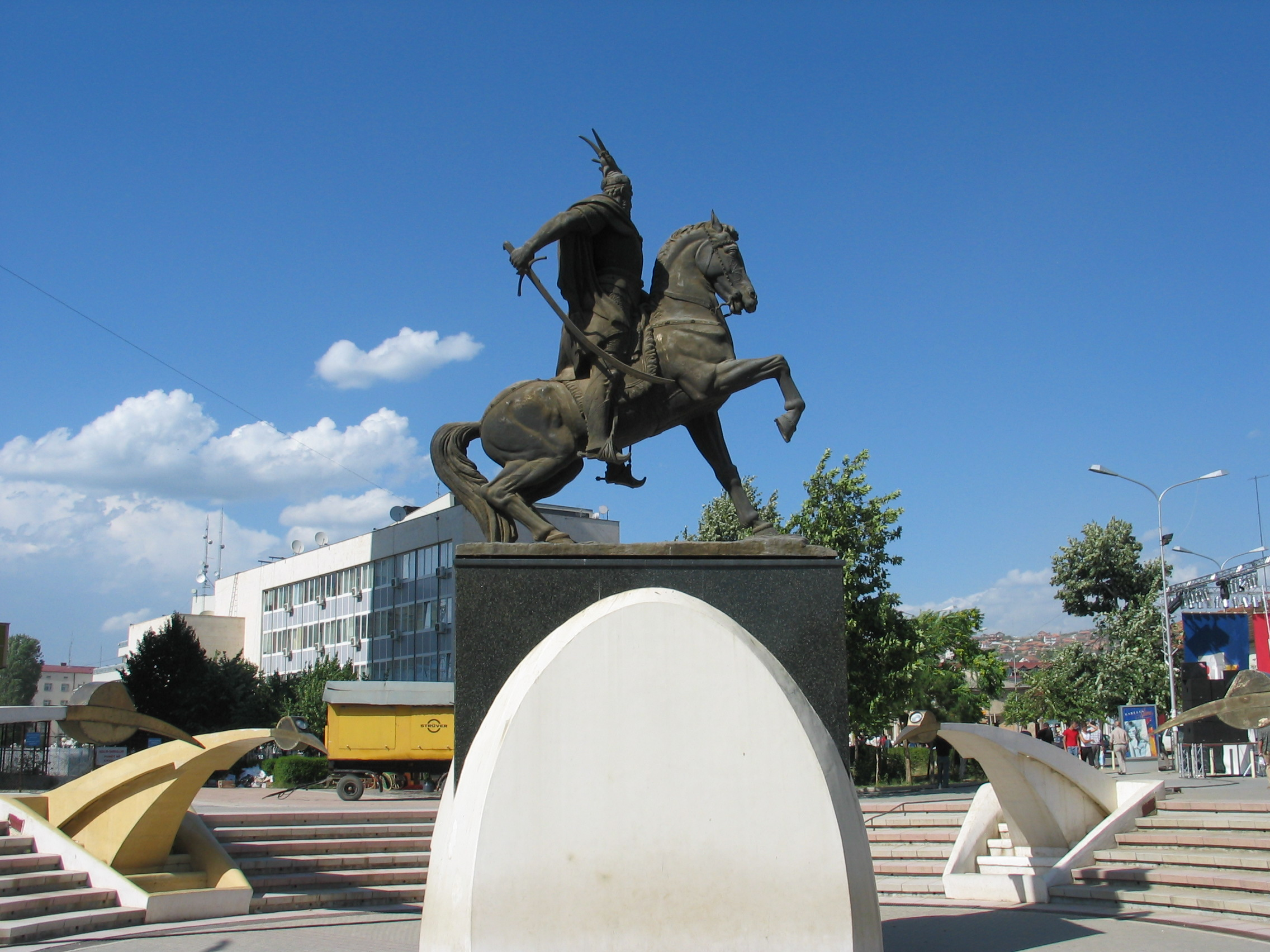
Skanderbeg statue on old pedestal (2000s)

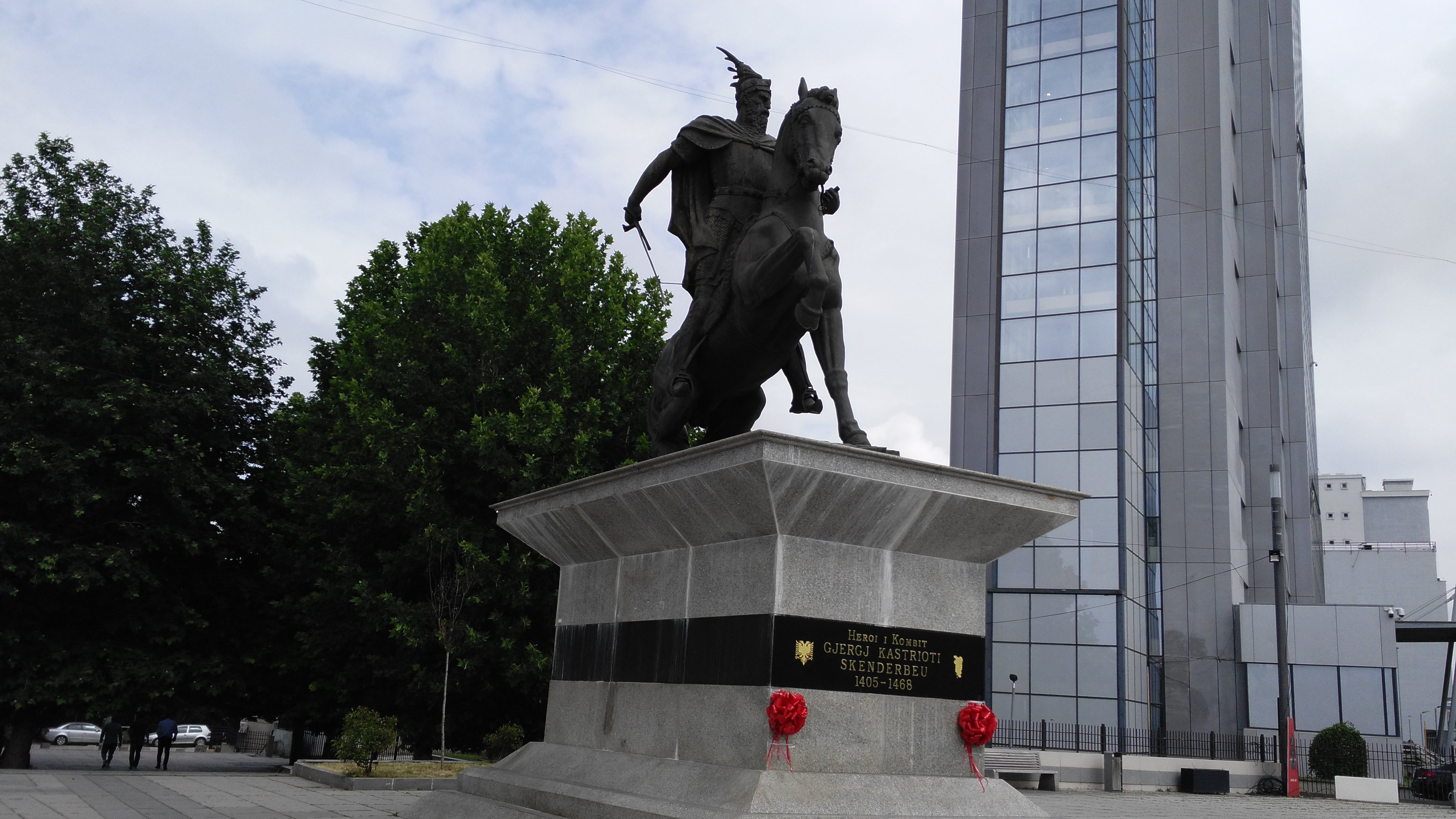
Skanderbeg statue on new pedestal (2010s)

== See also ==
- Skanderbeg Square in Tirana, Albania
- Skanderbeg Square in Skopje, North Macedonia
