= Dimitar Apasiev =

Macedonian academic and politician (born 1983)

Dimitar Apasiev MP
- Димитар Апасиев
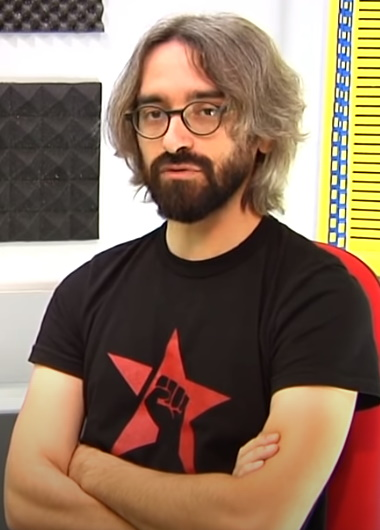
- Apasiev in 2020

President of Levica
- Incumbent
- Assumed office November 2015

Personal details
- Born: 22 September 1983 (age 43) Titov Veles, SR Macedonia, SFR Yugoslavia (present-day North Macedonia)
- Party: The Left

Academic background
- Education: Ss. Cyril and Methodius University of Skopje

Academic work
- Discipline: Roman Law
- Institutions: Goce Delčev University of Štip

Dimitar Apasiev (Macedonian: Димитар Апасиев) is a Macedonian legal scholar and politician. He is the leader of the political party The Left and a professor of Law at the Goce Delčev University of Štip. During the 2020 Macedonian parliamentary election, his party won two seats, making him a member of the Assembly of North Macedonia.

== Early life ==
Apasiev was born on 22 September 1983 in Titov Veles, Yugoslavia, now a part of North Macedonia.

== Education ==
Apasiev completed his undergraduate degree in 2009, and his Master's degree in 2010. In 2015, he completed a PhD specializing in Roman law at the state university Ss. Cyril and Methodius in Skopje.

== Career ==
Apasiev is an author of a number of books and monographs, including over 50 academic articles and papers. He has been a legal consultant to several state judicial bodies, trade unions, civil society organizations and informal activist initiatives.

=== Political career ===
In November 2015, Apasiev co-founded The Left, a political party which combined a number of leftist movements in North Macedonia.

The Left as well as Apasiev himself have been described by some journalists and party's founders as "fascist". However, this is a misconception since the party's ideology is still largely far-left. In September 2020, Apasiev testified at the Public Prosecutor's Office in Skopje after receiving three criminal charges for spreading racial, religious, and ethnic intolerance. In the aftermath of the French proposal, Apasiev got involved in a publicized argument in July 2022 with the president of North Macedonia, Stevo Pendarovski, involving personal insults involving the president's late mother.
