= 2011 Macedonian protests =

The 2011 Macedonian protests against police brutality or simply 2011 Macedonian protests were demonstrations that started on 6 June 2011 as a result of the murder of the 22-year-old Martin Neškovski, who was beaten to death by Igor Spasov, a member of the special police forces Tigers. The case itself is also tied to the 2015 Macedonian protests.

== Prelude ==
In the early morning hours of 6 June 2011, while the ruling VMRO-DPMNE party celebrated its early election victory in the main square in the capital, Skopje, 22-year-old Martin Neškovski, unarmed and celebrating the victory, was beaten to death by a member of the special forces 'Tigers' charged with securing the celebrations and protecting the Prime Minister. His body was covered up with cardboard and left, as if nothing had happened. However, Since his killing had been witnessed by scores of people, it was publicized via X (then Twitter). The following day, the Ministry of the Interior made no mention of the killing and stated that they had no report of a killing. When asked by reporters about the 'tweets', both the Minister of the Interior and her spokesperson, spoke in contradictions..

== Protests ==
On the evening of 7 June, some 250 people gathered spontaneously in the center of the city and held a quiet protest, sitting down on the asphalt on one of the city's main arteries. The following day, a Facebook event invited people to symbolically protest against police brutality in front of the Mother Teresa Memorial House, where some 800 people peacefully protested and then marched through the streets with banners saying: "We want Justice", "STOP Police Brutality" and "Enough Silence – Speak Up". A few days later, on 10 June, a public holiday, between five and seven thousand took to the streets.

Many celebrities (artists, musicians, politicians, etc.) showed up and marched on the streets. Many of them sent their video messages supporting the protests against police brutality. Petar Stojkoviḱ, an actor, was among the most active ones in the media. He also took part in a public hearing held in the European Parliament (Brussels, 2011) where he shared his experience from the protests regarding the media coverage and spoke publicly about the pressures to silence the press and the attempts by the Macedonian government to cover up the truth for the murder of Martin Neškoski.

The protests were held every day throughout June, and some on July. The protesters met at 18:00 at the Mother Teresa Memorial House, and then proceeded to march along the main arteries of the capital Skopje, blocking all traffic, until they reached one of the state institutions (Parliament, High Court, Ministry of the Interior), where they peacefully sat down, chanted and held minutes of silence out of respect for the murdered young man.

== Reactions ==
Macedonian Twitter users rallied around the hashtags #Daniel, #Martin and #protestiram after the young man’s death, tweeting updates.

In the 2015 Macedonian protests, opposition leader Zoran Zaev accused PM Nikola Gruevski and other officials of attempting to cover up the murder of Martin Neškovski, revealing taped phone conversations. The allegations were denied by Gruevski, accusing the opposition of tampering with the tapes.

== Legal proceedings ==
After the murder, Igor Spasov reportedly turned himself in and charges were filed against him. During the trial, a small group of people protested before the court, led by Neškovski’s brother, Aleksandar. Igor Spasov was convicted of the murder and on 1 January 2012, he was found guilty and sentenced to 14 years in the Idrizovo prison. He was later given a suspended sentence temporarily for health reasons, which he used to flee from prison in 2019. An international arrest warrant was issued due to his escape. In 2021, Spasov was arrested in the Mladost district of the capital of Bulgaria over a domestic violence report by the Bulgarian police, where he was residing. The Bulgarian authorities discovered that he was wanted by Interpol and later extradited him to North Macedonia, where he was returned to the Idrizovo prison to serve the rest of his sentence.

== Aftermath ==
The European Court of Human Rights stated that the Republic of Macedonia conducted an efficient investigation in the case of Martin Neškovski.

Martin's father died by suicide nearly a year after the murder.

== See also ==
- List of protests in the 21st century
- List of cases of police brutality
- 2015 Macedonian protests
- 2016 Macedonian protests
- 2017 storming of Macedonian Parliament
- 2022 North Macedonia protests
