= Petar Stojkovikj =

Macedonian actor and human rights activist

- Петар Стојковиќ
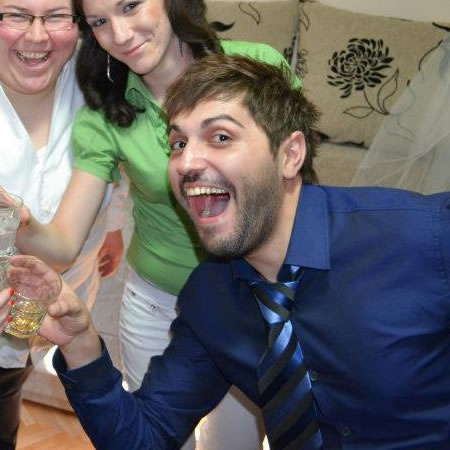
- Petar Stojkovikj at a cocktail party
- Born: Petar Stojkovikj; September 11, 1985 (age 40); Skopje, SR Macedonia, SFR Yugoslavia
- Education: Faculty of Dramatic Arts of the University of Skopje
- Occupation: Actor
- Years active: 2004–present
- Known for: Human rights activism
- Website: www.petarstojkovik.com

Petar Stojkovikj (Macedonian: Петар Стојковиќ; born 11 September 1985) is a Macedonian actor known for his work in theatre, television, and film. He is also an advocate for LGBT human rights.

== Early life and career ==
Stojkovikj was born in Skopje, SFR Yugoslavia (now North Macedonia). His mother, Ankica Stojkovikj (née Shishkova; 1951–2015), was a hairdresser, and his father, Miodrag Stojkovikj (1937–2007), was a chemical technician. He is the only child in the family. Raised in an Orthodox Christian household, he later became an atheist. He grew up in Skopje, where he attended Miladinovci Brothers High School. Stojkovikj earned a Bachelor of Fine Arts (BFA) in Acting from the Faculty of Dramatic Arts in Skopje, where he studied under Professor Vladimir Milchin and Assistant Professor Suzana Kirandziska.

While studying at the Faculty of Dramatic Arts, Stojkovikj performed a variety of roles on stage, ranging from the young and naive Andrei Sergeyevich Prozorov in Three Sisters by Anton Pavlovich Chekhov to the cruel and twisted Husband in Round Dance by Arthur Schnitzler.

After graduating, he was invited by the Theater for Children and Youth in Skopje to appear as a guest actor in Alice in Wonderland in May 2011. In December 2011, he signed a contract with the theater to play the role of the Cowardly Lion in The Wizard of Oz, a musical directed by Bonjo Lungov.

Stojkovikj has performed on various stages, including the Academic Stage of the Faculty of Dramatic Arts, the Macedonian National Theater, the Children's Theater Center, and the Theater for Children and Youth. He has also participated in numerous festivals, including:

- Vojdan Chernodrinski Theater Festival – Prilep, North Macedonia
- DAF (Drama Amateur Festival) – Kočani, North Macedonia
- Skomrahi Student Theater Festival – Skopje, North Macedonia
- SKENA UP International Students' Festival – Pristina, Kosovo
- Skopje Summer Festival – Skopje, North Macedonia
- Ohrid Summer Festival – Ohrid, North Macedonia
- FIST (Festival of International Student Theatre) – Belgrade, Serbia
- Kotor International Festival of Children's Theaters – Kotor, Montenegro
- International Festival of Children's Theaters – Banja Luka, Bosnia and Herzegovina
- Subotica International Festival of Children's Theatres – Subotica, Serbia

Stojkovikj made his television debut in 2008 with a role in the television series Circle, directed by Miodrag Magyar, which aired on the local TV station SKY NET. That same year, he was cast in a leading role in Speak Macedonian, a television miniseries produced by Macedonian Radio Television. The series was filmed at various locations across Skopje from January to April 2008.

In 2008, Stojkovikj appeared in a television commercial for Cipso (chips), produced by Digital Star, a film production company based in Skopje, North Macedonia.

In 2010, Stojkovikj made his film debut with a supporting role in Pink Panties Thursday, a 24-minute short film written, produced, and directed by the controversial filmmaker Sofija Teodor. The film explores the complexities of mixed-orientation marriage, depicting the hidden struggles of a bisexual husband as he confronts societal prejudices and his own internal frustrations. The film was broadcast on several television stations across North Macedonia.

== Awards ==
In 2012, the cast of The Wizard of Oz, a musical produced by the Theater for Children and Youth in Skopje, received an award for outstanding acting performance at the 19th Subotica International Festival of Children's Theatres in Serbia.

== Human rights activism ==
Petar Stojkovikj is a former member of the Executive Board of the Helsinki Committee for Human Rights of the Republic of Macedonia.

During the 2011 Macedonian protests Stojkovikj participated in daily demonstrations and was among the most prominent voices in the media. He also took part in a public hearing organized by the Alliance of Liberals and Democrats for Europe, held in the European Parliament in Brussels 20 September 2011. At the hearing, he shared his experiences regarding the protests and the media coverage surrounding them.

Stojkovikj spoke about the pressures to silence the press, including public threats, labeling, and personal attacks he experienced from pro-government media. He also addressed the government's alleged attempts to cover up the murder of Martin Neškoski.

In 2012, Stojkovikj participated in the March for Tolerance, an annual event organized by the Helsinki Committee for Human Rights of the Republic of Macedonia. That year's march, held on 16 November to mark the International Day of Tolerance, was dedicated to the LGBT community in North Macedonia, which had been the target of an ongoing homophobic campaign. The campaign had intensified in the preceding months, following an attack on the newly opened LGBTI Support Centre in Skopje and several homophobic statements made by high-ranking government officials.

The march also aimed to show support for women who had been targeted by a hate-speech campaign seeking to exclude and suppress societal diversity. The campaign particularly focused on women whose values and priorities did not conform to traditional gender roles in society.

The Helsinki Committee for Human Rights and the Coalition for Sexual and Health Rights called on the government of the Republic of North Macedonia to amend the Criminal Code to include provisions for sanctioning hate crimes and hate speech based on sexual orientation and gender identity.

In August 2013, Stojkovikj was invited as an international guest by the People's Party for Freedom and Democracy (VVD) to attend Amsterdam Gay Pride and speak about the challenges faced by the LGBT community in his country. VVD regularly invites LGBT rights advocates from across Europe to highlight the international nature of the struggle for equal rights.

During his visit to Amsterdam, Stojkovikj met with representatives from various governmental and non-governmental organizations in the Netherlands. He also delivered a public speech on the status and accessibility of human rights for the LGBTI community in North Macedonia.

== Being a foster family ==
Stojkovikj encouraged his parents to become a foster family, providing care and support to children in need. To date, 21 children have been temporarily accommodated in their home. One of these children, an autistic girl named Gordana Gligorovska, has been with the family for 13 years and recently celebrated her 14th birthday.

In 2011, Stojkovikj faced a legal battle to keep Gordana at home after encountering obstacles and inconsistencies in the law. Social Services had attempted to place her in an institution for individuals with mental disabilities. The case quickly attracted media attention, and, following significant public pressure, the Ministry of Labor and Social Policy of North Macedonia ruled that it was in the child's best interest to remain with her foster family. Officials also pledged to address the legal shortcomings highlighted by Gordana's case in discussions within the Committee on Labor and Social Policy in the Macedonian Parliament.

== Theater ==
Year	Title	Role	Company
2004	"Dear Father" by Franz Kafka	Franz Kafka	Macedonian National Theater - Skopje (North Macedonia)
2005	"Anastasia" by Sofija T. Teodor	Dominique	Kontrapunkt - Skopje (Republic of Macedonia)
2007	"Three Sisters" by Anton Pavlovich Chekhov	Andrei Sergeyevich Prozorov	Faculty of Dramatic Arts - Skopje (North Macedonia)
2007	"Chorbadzi Teodos" by Vasil Iljoski	Teodos	Faculty of Dramatic Arts - Skopje (North Macedonia)
2007	"Fright of Plautus" based on the comedies of Titus Maccius Plautus	One of the Menaechmi	Faculty of Dramatic Arts - Skopje (North Macedonia)
2007	"Ivanov" by Anton Pavlovich Chekhov	Borkin	Faculty of Dramatic Arts - Skopje (North Macedonia)
2008	"Erinyes, slaves and rulers" based on tragedies by Aeschylus and Euripides	Apollo, Agamemnon and Cadmus	Faculty of Dramatic Arts - Skopje (North Macedonia)
2008	"Theatre on the run" inspired by "Balaganchik" by Alexander Blok and "Our friend René" by Július Satinský and Milan Lasica	Different characters	Faculty of Dramatic Arts - Skopje (North Macedonia)
2008	"What the fuck started all this" by Dejan Dukovski	Crna Arapina	Youth Open Theater - Skopje (North Macedonia)
2009	"Round Dance" by Arthur Schnitzler	The Husband	Faculty of Dramatic Arts - Skopje (North Macedonia)
2009	"The Bear" by Anton Pavlovich Chekhov	Smirnoff	Faculty of Dramatic Arts - Skopje (North Macedonia)
2011	"The Magic Box" by Martina Taparchevska	The Father	Microsoft - Skopje (North Macedonia)
2011	"Alice in Wonderland" by Lewis Carroll	The Eagle and The King of Hearts	Theater for Children and Youth - Skopje (North Macedonia)
2011	"The Wizard of Oz" by Lyman Frank Baum	The Cowardly Lion	Theater for Children and Youth - Skopje (North Macedonia)
2019	"A Life For A Dream", a performance choreographed by Krenare Nevzati - Keri	Hephaestus and other characters	Faculty of Dramatic Arts - Skopje in cooperation with the Macedonian National Theater - Skopje (North Macedonia)

== Film and television ==
Year	Title	Role	Company
2010	"Pink Panties Thursday", a short movie (runtime: 24 min)	Luka	Macedonian Radio Television - Skopje, North Macedonia; Filmme Fatale - Belgrade, Serbia; Faculty of Dramatic Arts - Skopje, North Macedonia; Urban Film - Skopje, North Macedonia
2008	"Cipso", a TV commercial	As Himself	Digital Star Production - Skopje, North Macedonia
2008	"Speak Macedonian" - TV Mini-series	Different characters	Macedonian Radio Television - Skopje, North Macedonia
2008	"Circle" - TV Serial	The drug addict	Art Ulica 26 - Skopje, North Macedonia
