= Skanderbeg Square, Skopje =

Square in Skopje, North Macedonia

Skanderbeg Square Плоштад Скендербег Sheshi i Skënderbeut
- Public square
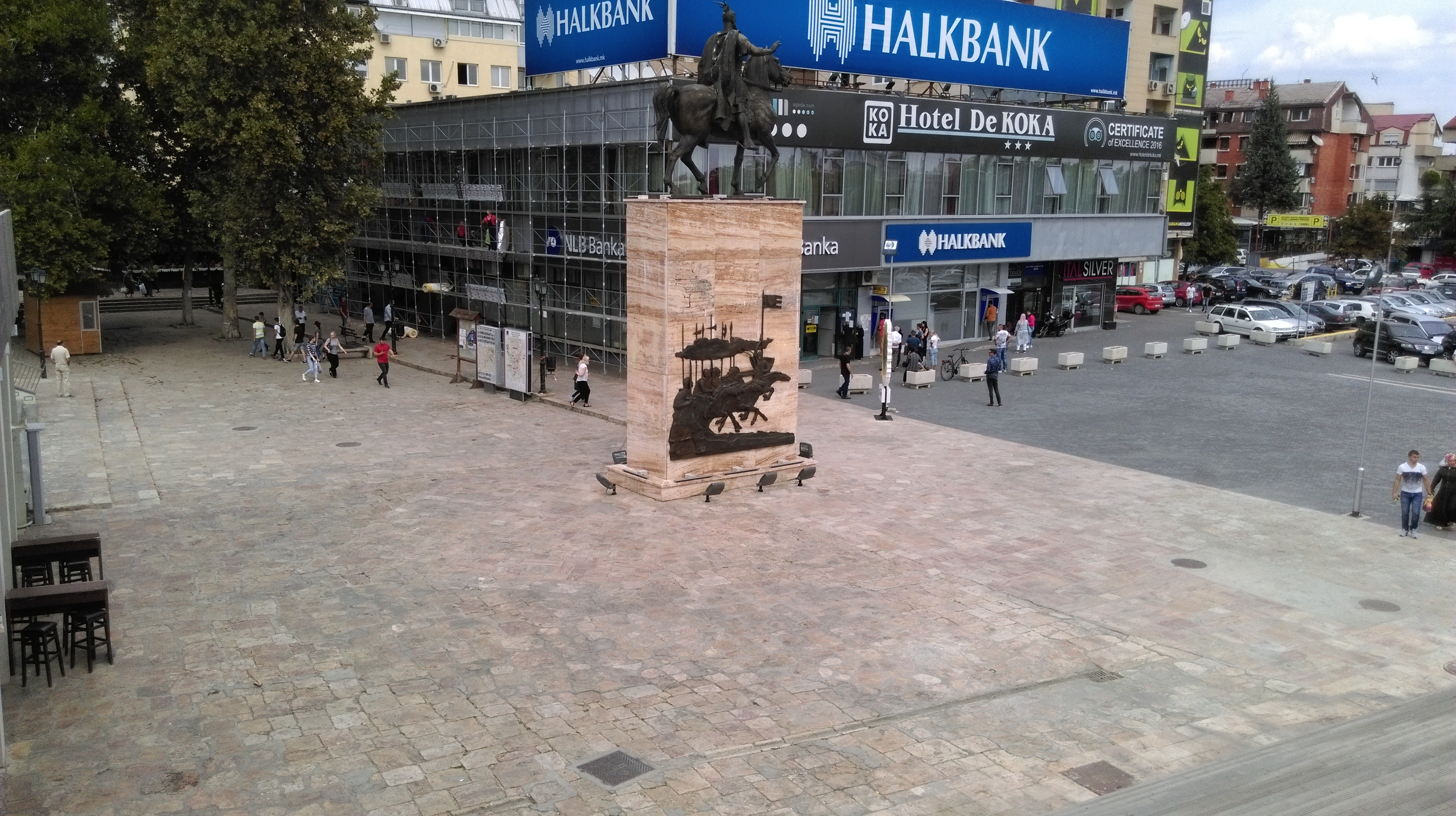
- Skanderbeg's statue in the square
- Owner: Čair Municipality
- Interactive map of Skanderbeg Square; Плоштад Скендербег; Sheshi i Skënderbeut
- Coordinates: 41°59′57″N 21°26′14″E

Skanderbeg Square (Macedonian: Плоштад „Скендербег“, romanized: Ploštad Skenderbeg; Albanian: Sheshi i "Skënderbeut") is a square in Skopje, North Macedonia.

A statue of Gjergj Kastrioti Skanderbeg was installed in 2006 and the square underwent a refurbishment that began on 17 January 2012 and was completed in segments between 2014 and 2018. The total cost for the square is estimated at 10 million euros. The square covers 28,000 m^{2} (301,389 ft^{2}) and extends from the Macedonian Philharmonic and Macedonian Opera to the Old Bazaar of Skopje. During the refurbishment process a portion of the square was built on top of Goce Delčev Boulevard. Aside from plenty of open space, the square contains an amphitheatre, a fountain, underground parking and murals depicting important figures and scenes from Albanian history.

An equestrian statue of Skanderbeg, a medieval Albanian Ruler who fought against Ottoman forces, is located within Skanderbeg Square and symbolically serves to delineate the space for ethnic Albanians. The bronze statue is seven meters high with Skanderbeg depicted with a deep gaze sitting upright on a horse with his right hand raised and sword placed in its sheath. The Skanderbeg statue of Skopje shares a similar socialist aesthetic and equestrian posture with minor differences in detail to existing Skanderbeg monuments in Tirana, Pristina and other places in Europe. Albanians use Skanderbeg Square to organise large gatherings that celebrate sporting or cultural and political events such as dates significant to the present and past of the Albanians.

== History ==
=== Proposal and initial planning ===
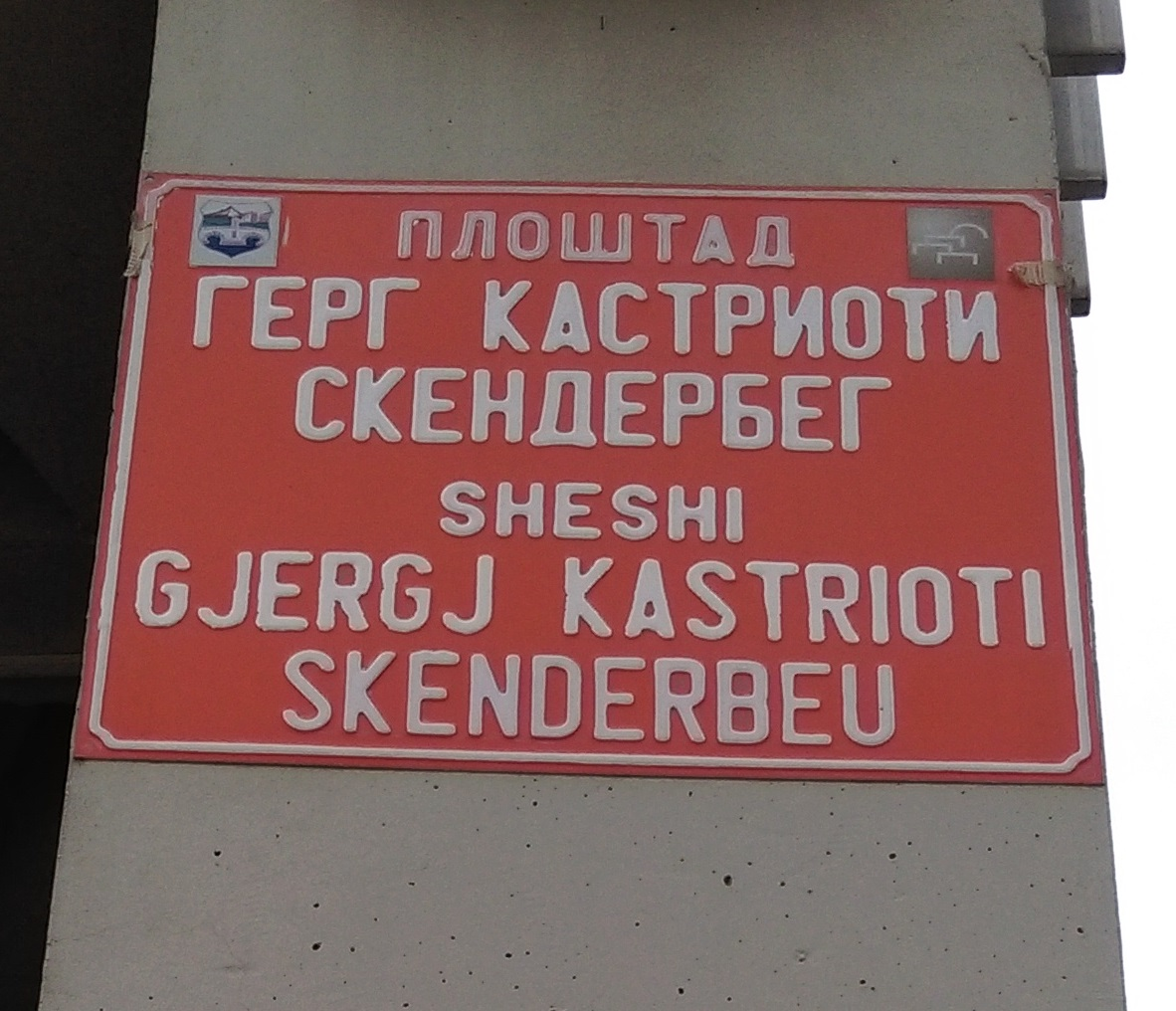
Bilingual sign designating Skanderbeg Square

In 2005 the 600th birthday of Skanderbeg was commemorated within the Balkans in Albania, Kosovo and Macedonia through academic conferences and other celebrations. Albanian Democratic Union for Integration (DUI) politician Mayor Izet Mexhiti of Čair municipality made an announcement on 22 November 2005 that the municipal council had approved to construct a Skanderbeg monument by the entrance of the Old Bazaar. The move was controversial and contested by the Heritage Protection director on grounds that the proposed area was a historical protected location and that such cases needed approval from the Culture Ministry. In early 2006 Skopje City Council asked Čair municipality to cease building on the site as the monument could be interpreted as illegal. Mayor Mexhiti cited that a 2004 decision of Skopje City Council that created a list of figures from history that could be placed within the Skopje. Other reasons given for postponing the project came from the Skopje Department for the Protection of Cultural Heritage which stated that the boundaries of the Old Bazaar were not clearly defined and a law to guard the site needed to be enacted.

Mayor Mexhiti used a new legal argument for the monument by referencing the Law on monuments and memorials (2004) that gave Čair municipality full responsibility for issuing the building permit. Thoma Thomai, a sculptor from Albania was selected to design the monument and he was assisted by Edmond Papathimiu on the project. As such the project at the time was viewed by ethnic Macedonians and other minority communities as signifying close connections between Macedonian Albanians and Albania. Members involved in the project commission took into account Macedonian sensitivities and selected a statue posture of Skanderbeg with sword in sheath and right hand raised to greet people coming into the area to portray an image of peaceful wisdom and not his military prowess. Albanians from other parts of North Macedonia have viewed Albanians in Çair as less authentically Albanian due to living in a more multi-ethnic environment and interaction with Macedonians. These factors made Çair Albanians participate in the Skanderbeg project to highlight the Albanianess of Skopje. Private funds paid for the Skanderbeg monument.

=== Construction phase ===
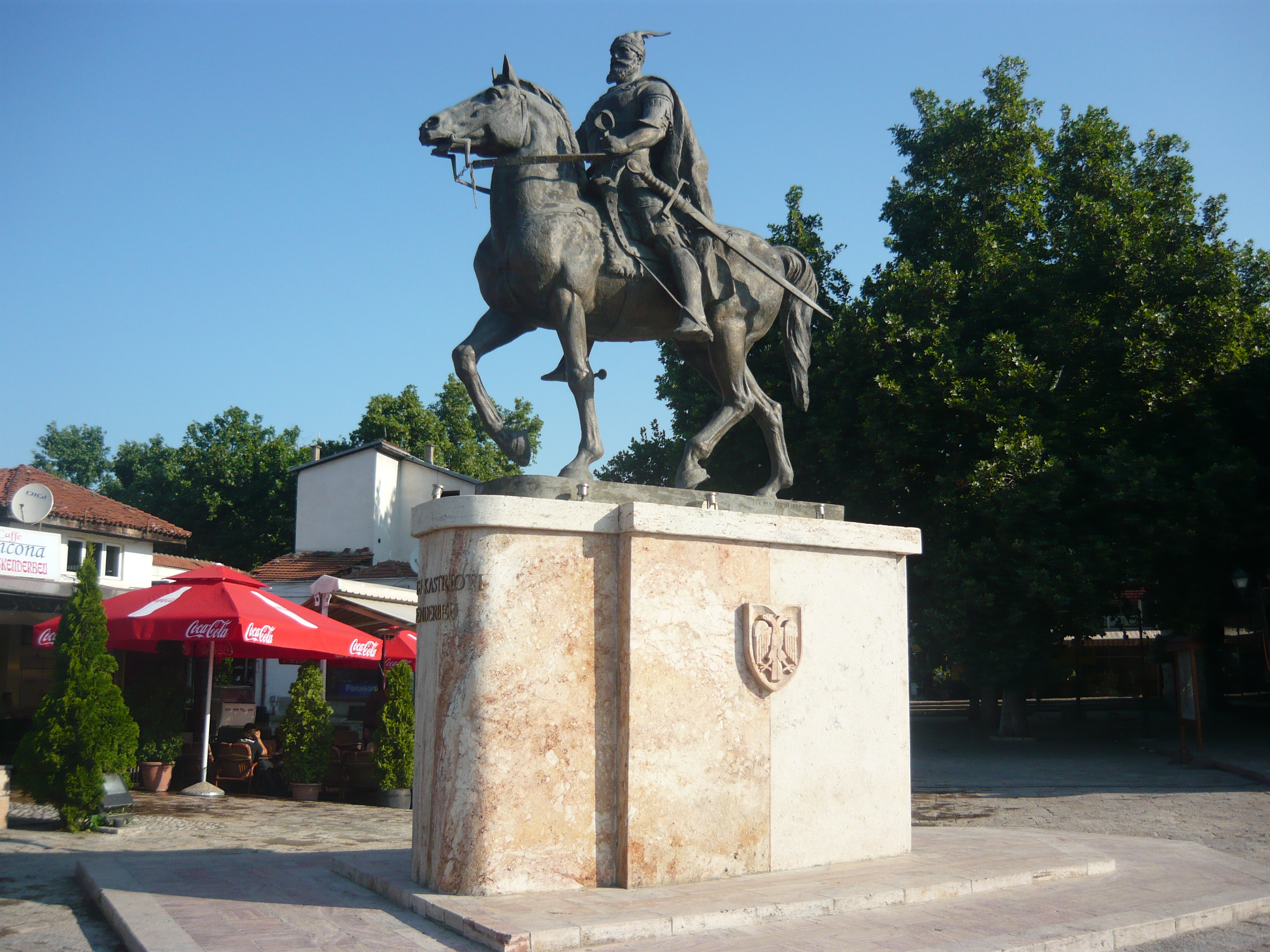
Skanderbeg's monument and square in the late 2000s

The Skanderbeg monument project created the opportunity for local Albanians to connect their experiences with other Albanians within the Balkans and highlight symbolic links which unite them regionally. Once the statue was completed, Ali Ahmeti, the leader of DUI had the Skanderbeg statue travel on a truck from Tirana to Albanian populated cities such as Debar, Gostivar and Tetovo in the country's west with its final destination point at Skopje. The journey of the statue revisited places in modern North Macedonia associated with various aspects of Skanderbeg's battles. During stopovers the Skanderbeg monument was celebrated and it symbolised a connection between Albanian populated areas. The project also embodied a desire to highlight the input that Albanians in North Macedonia had contributed to Albanian history. Ahmeti, as a politician refrained from hyping his armed combat role during the 2001 conflict and a need arose to highlight his wartime legitimacy due to some Democratic Party of Albanians (DPA) and DUI members interpreting his political actions as placating the Macedonians. The Skanderbeg project gave Ahmeti the opportunity to strengthen his public image among Albanians and secure support for his leadership of DUI among its members and supporters along with countering the DPA.

Following parliamentary elections in 2006, political wrangling in the country over who would form government with the larger Macedonian parties led to a political spat between two Albanian parties DUI and the DPA. DUI, previously a coalition partner with the Macedonian Social Democratic Union of Macedonia (SDSM) lost out in the new government coalition composed of the DPA and larger Macedonian VMRO-DPMNE. The rivalry between both Albanian parties played out over the monument for a year as the DPA kept its distance from assisting DUI in finishing the project and claimed they were using Albanian symbols for political gain. During that time the DPA was under pressure to assist Albanians and not let the project fail due to its high symbolism. The impasse was broken on 23 November when the monument was legalised through votes on the Skopje City Council from DUI and its rival the DPA, along with the Macedonian VMRO-DPMNE, while the SDSM voted no. A similar result occurred in Čair Municipality Council with the votes coming from DUI and the SDSM, while most of the DPA counselors were not present and the VMRO-DPMNE voted no. After the Skopje City Council decision was publicised the DPA took credit in the media that they were responsible for a change in policy as they claimed to have swayed their government coalition partner VMRO-DPMNE weeks earlier on the matter.

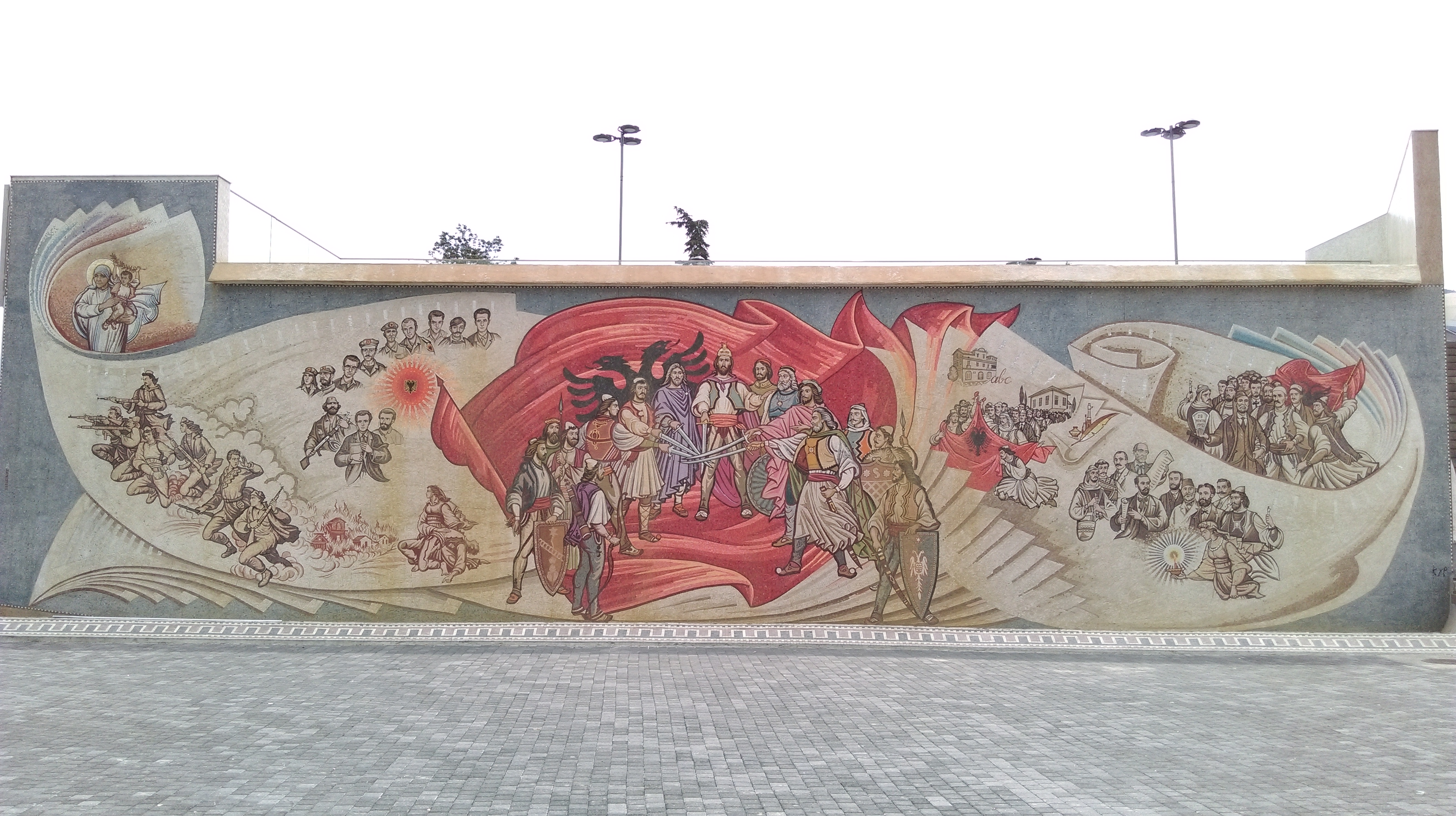
Large mural showing celebrated figures and important scenes from Albanian history. Skanderbeg is figure in centre

=== Inauguration ceremony (2006) ===
In the Balkans, Skopje became the third city after Tirana and Pristina to install a Skanderbeg statue of similar equestrian features to the others and the act of commemoration by Albanian elites in North Macedonia drew upon common Albanian cultural maps, imaginations and symbolism. At the time the Skanderbeg statue was placed in a specific direction with a staring gaze fixated upon the southern areas of the city and the large and visible Millennium Cross on the opposite end of Skopje. The installment of the monument in the middle section of the Ottoman area of Skopje inhabited mainly by Albanians was their effort to mark an Albanian presence within the capital city. Prior to the unveiling ceremony postcards were printed by Çair municipality that hailed the new statue with the words "Skënderbeu... edhe në Shkup" (Skanderbeg... in Skopje too). Macedonian President Branko Crvenkovski (SDSM) along with Mayor Mexhiti privately visited the monument before the unveiling occurred. Prime Minister Nikola Gruevski (VMRO-DPMNE) was not present at the unveiling ceremony as DUI officials still reeling over events related to the electoral aftermath made an invitation to him as a private citizen and not a statesman. DPA officials were also not present at the ceremony claiming that DUI was using the event to obscure its inefficiencies toward improving Albanian rights in the country. On 28 November 2006, an equestrian statue of Skanderbeg wrapped with a large Albanian flag was unveiled at the entrance of the Old Bazaar.

The ceremony was attended by Western diplomats such as the EU representative and US ambassador, by Daut Haradinaj from Kosovo, the Macedonian Deputy Prime Minister for European Integration and Albanian politicians from North Macedonia that included Ali Ahmeti and Mayor Mexhiti. Also present alongside Ahmeti were other dignitaries such as Fazli Veli, Gëzim Ostreni and Rafiz Aliti associated with the former Albanian National Liberation Army (NLA). Albanian President Alfred Moisiu was not at the ceremony and sent his congratulations to others who were present. The event was choreographed to create a symbolic connection between Ali Ahmeti, a former commander during the 2001 insurgency and Skanderbeg related to standing up for the Albanian cause and its struggles. Ahmeti gave a speech and thanked members of the international community that were present at the ceremony. The speech made references to Albanians in the country, asking them to place differences aside and called for unity within the group declaring that the November event was a "victory for all citizens of North Macedonia".

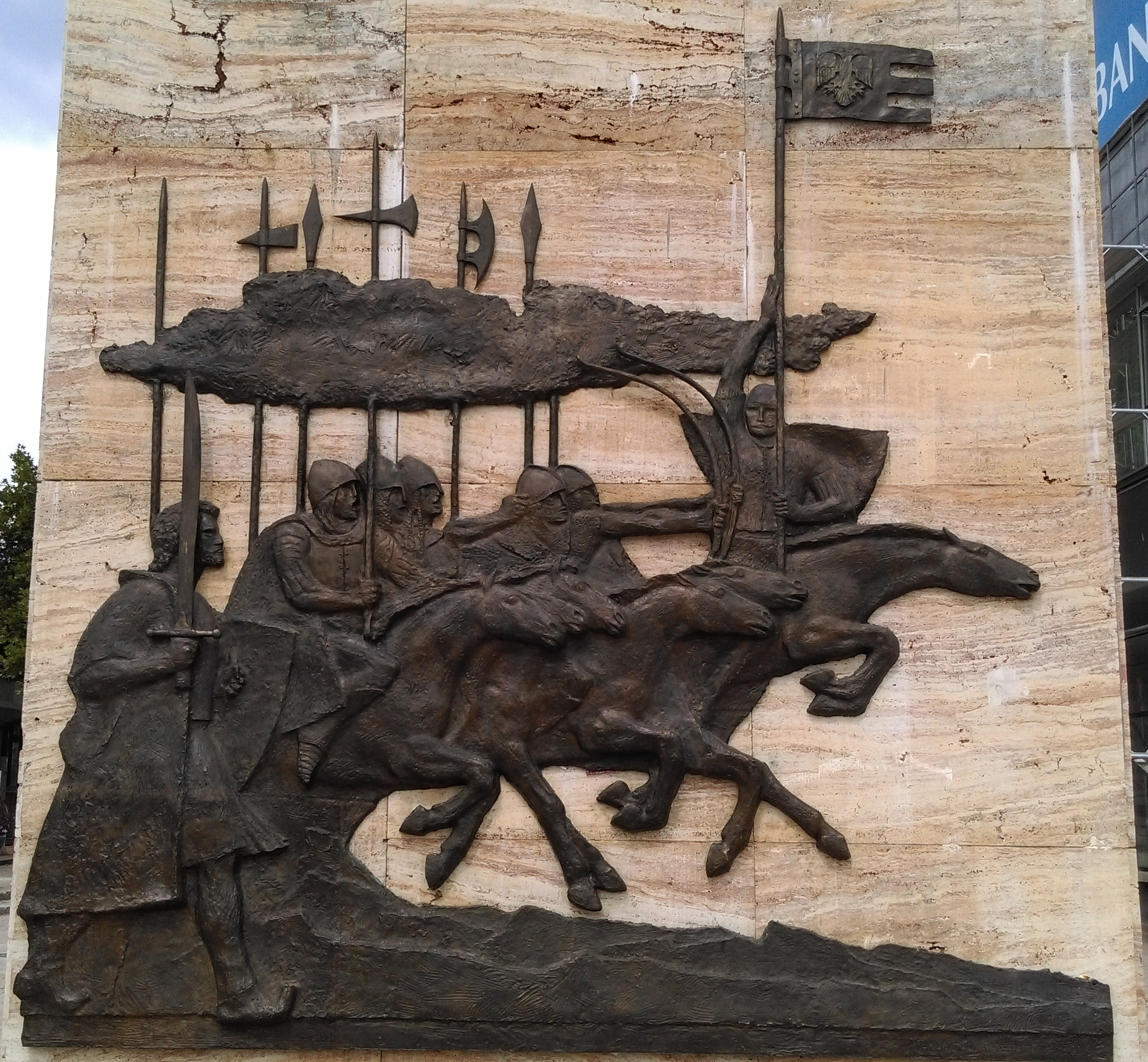
Bronze relief depicting Skanderbeg's armies

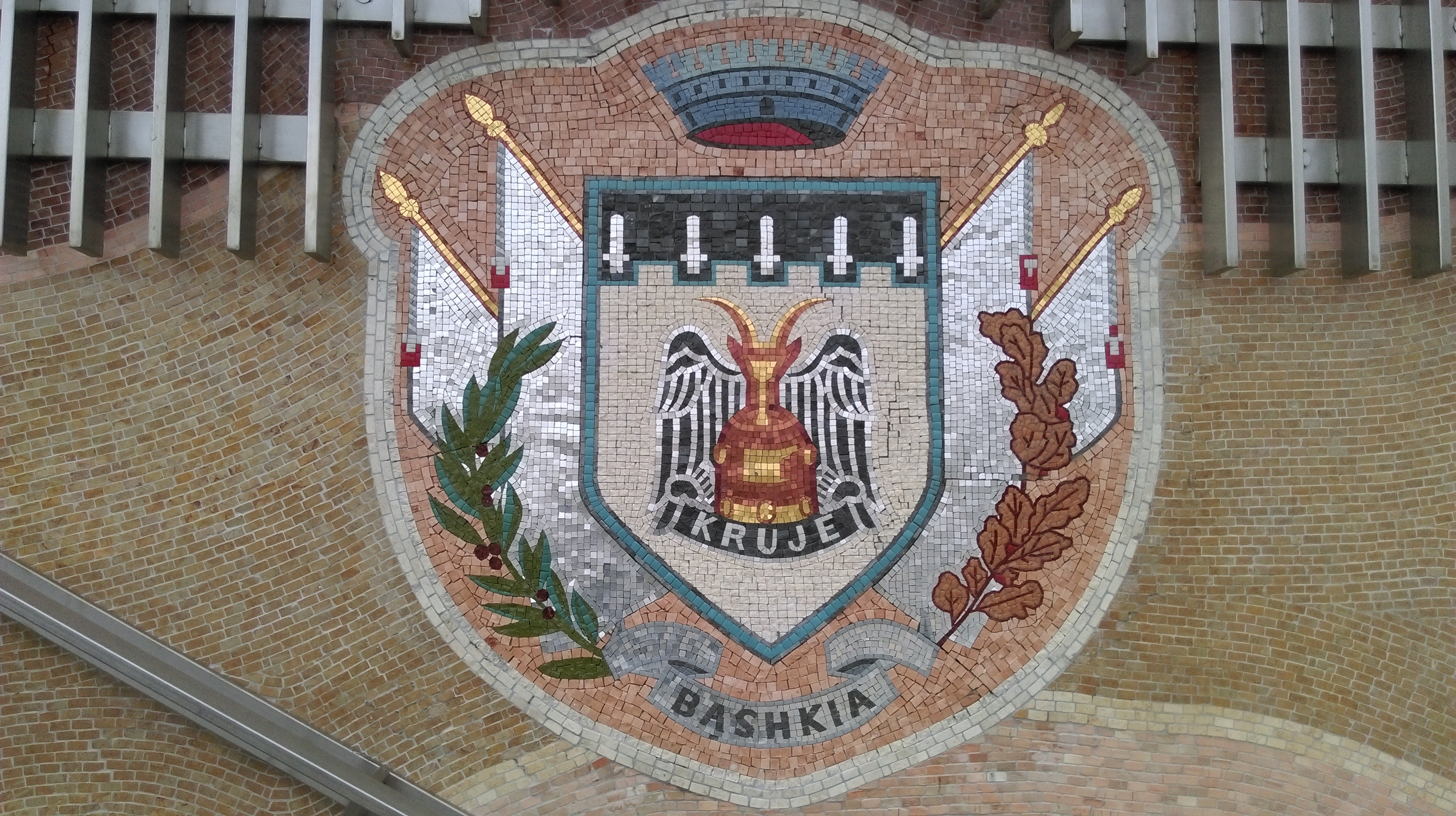
Coat of arms of Krujë municipality in the square

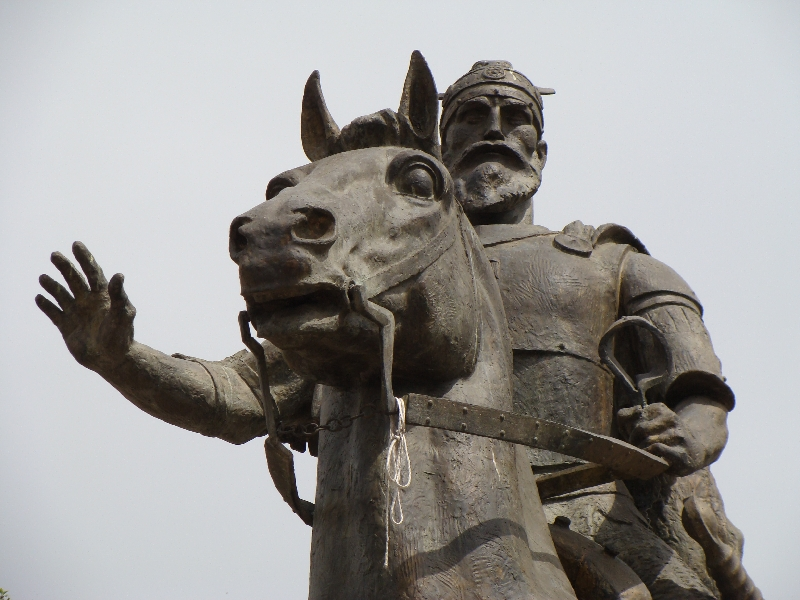
Skanderbeg with right hand raised in greeting pose

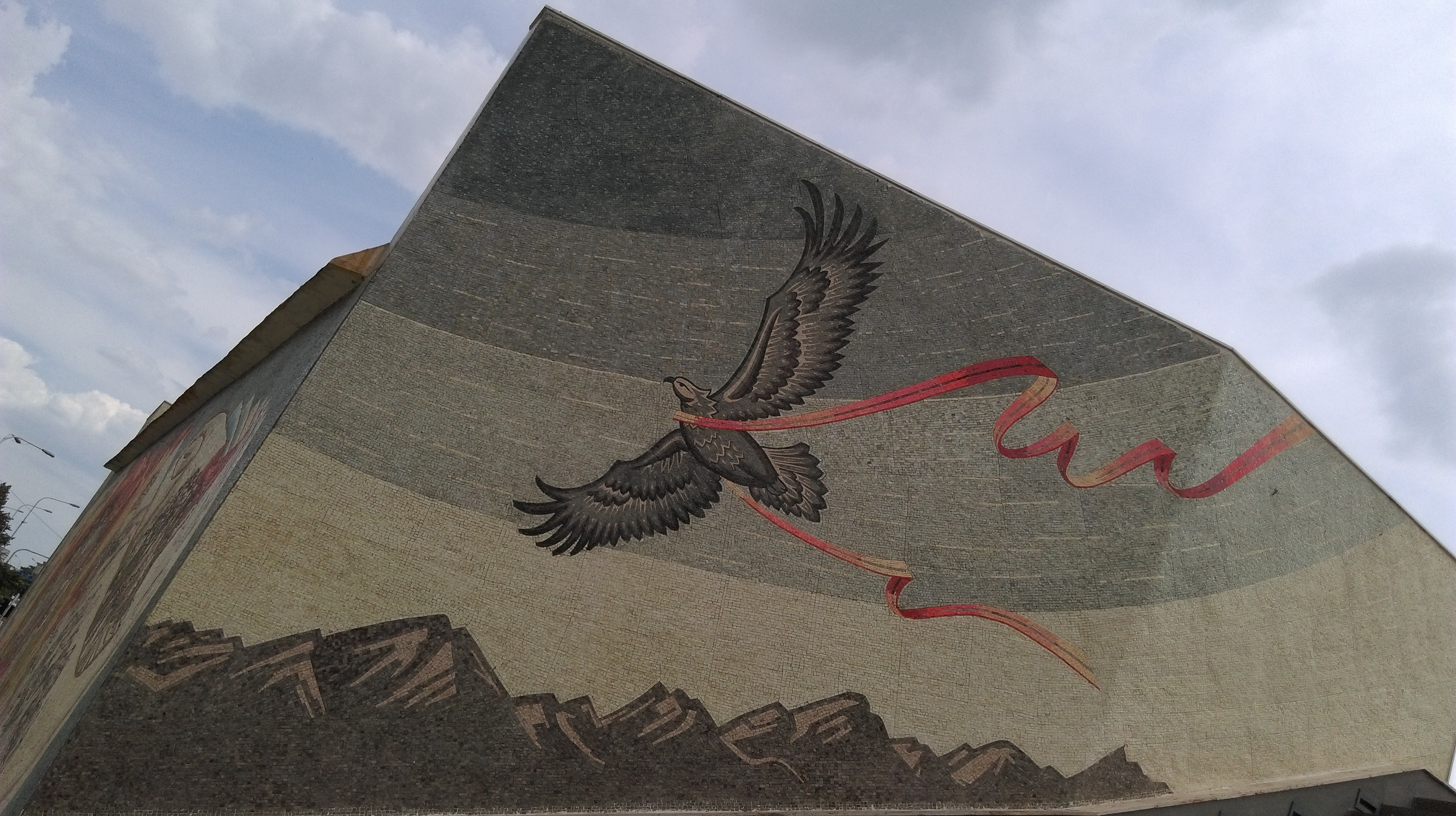
Mural of the Albanian eagle

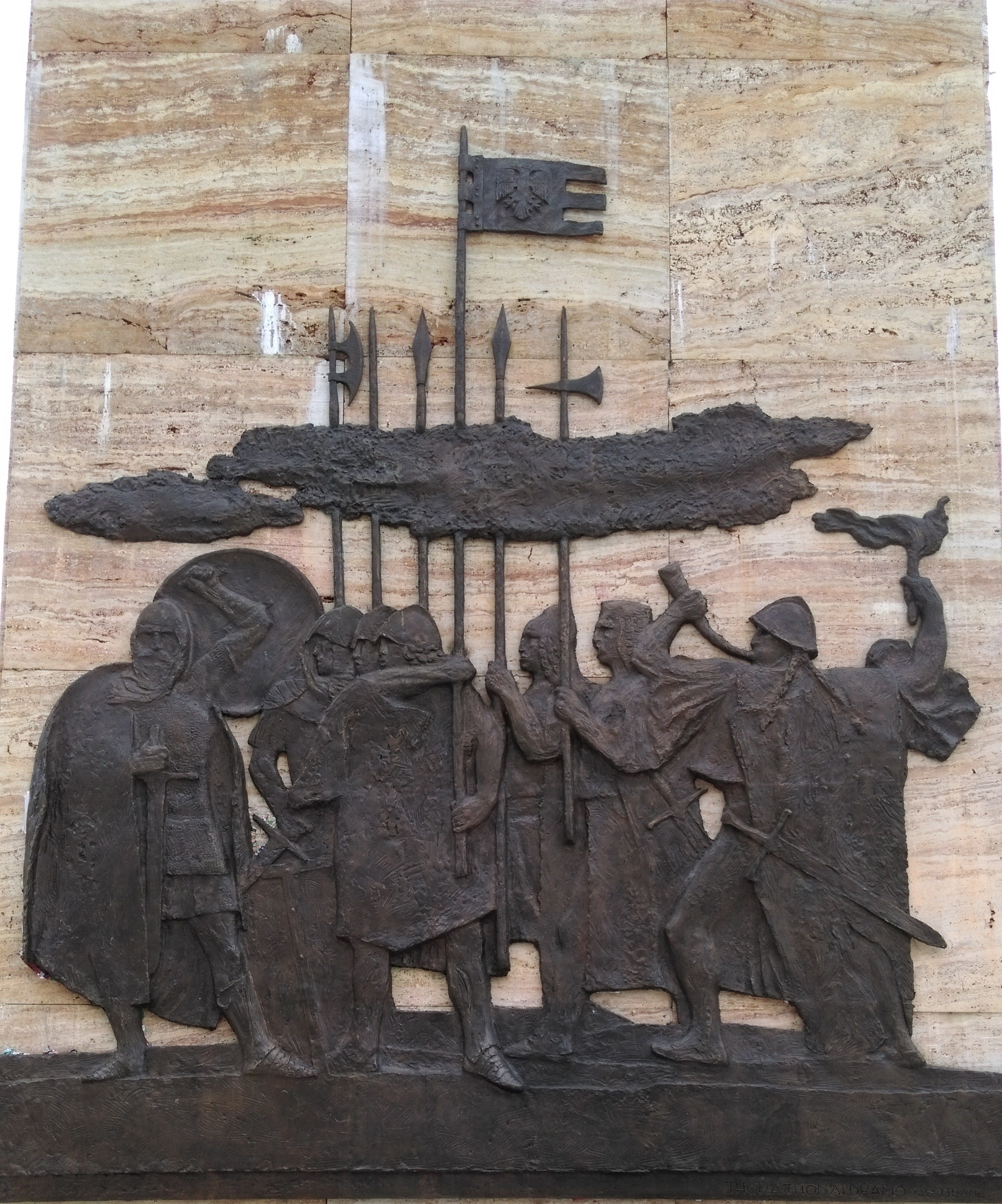
Bronze relief depicting Skanderbeg's armies

=== Public opinion and usage (late 2000s) ===
Shortly after the installment of the Skanderbeg monument, locals called the space around the statue "Skanderbeg Square". Three years after the Skanderbeg statue was erected certain views and interpretations of the monument emerged among the public. Of those were claims that the statue was orientated south-west toward Albania as a reminder for Macedonians that local Albanians sought future unification with the Albanian state. Another was that the monument highlighted the religious symbolism of Skanderbeg and represented a re-islamisation of the Albanian population of Skopje contributing to the capital city's political and geographic Muslim-Orthodox divide. Some other Macedonians expressed that the whole affair over the monument was a political ploy as Macedonians have done similar actions with statues in other places within North Macedonia. For other Skopje locals the hero status of Skanderbeg is not confined only as being Albanian but also Balkan and European that deserves to be celebrated in relation to his defense of European values and struggle against the Ottomans. In 2007 Skopje Albanians celebrated the independence of Kosovo in Skanderbeg Square with the Albanian and American flags hoisted on the statue. Albanian visitors from within the Balkans and the American and European diaspora come to see the statue and pose in front of it for photos with families and friends. The new monument has also drawn foreigners to the square as another reason to the visit the area of the Old Bazaar with its many shops and Ottoman architecture.

=== Refurbishment (2010s) ===
The Macedonian Government initiated a controversial refurbishment project of the capital city named Skopje 2014 and the development of Skanderbeg Square was largely omitted from the project. Čair municipality Mayor Mexhiti responded by announcing their own counterpart to Skopje 2014 with a refurbishment project for Skanderbeg Square located in the Old Bazaar that borders the old town. Plans by ethnic Albanians of Skopje to build a second city square was widely seen at the time as a rival project to the government's “Skopje 2014” revamp scheme. Funds for the refurbishment of Skanderbeg Square mostly came from the Macedonian Government and were subject to political negotiation between Albanian and Macedonian elites. Among Macedonians and Albanians Skanderbeg Square with its costs and symbols has divided public opinion. Sentiments include Skanderbeg Square being national Albanian pride and symbolism to negative territorial demarcation and nationalism or that funds could have been better spent elsewhere to improve Çair municipal services and infrastructure. Skanderbeg Square has been viewed by many ordinary citizens, politicians and the media as an act of Albanian resistance, part of a symbolic struggle against the government that has been strongly criticised by Macedonians for having an ethno-national focus and supposed vengeful connotation. The Skanderbeg Square project has heightened the demarcation of central Skopje along ethnic lines such as the old town associated with being Albanian territory, a process that increased following the conclusion of the 2001 conflict.

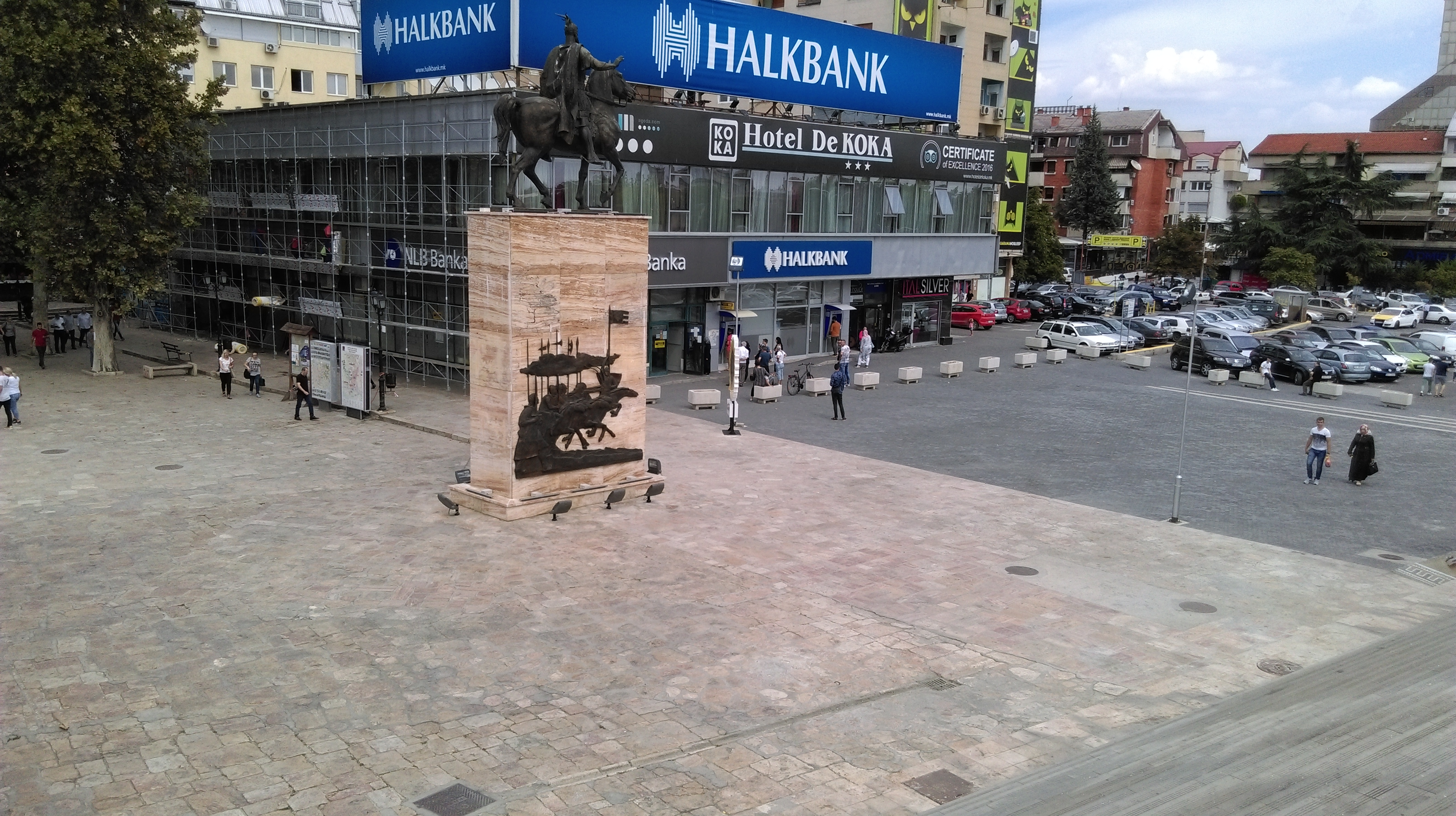
Panorama of Skanderbeg square

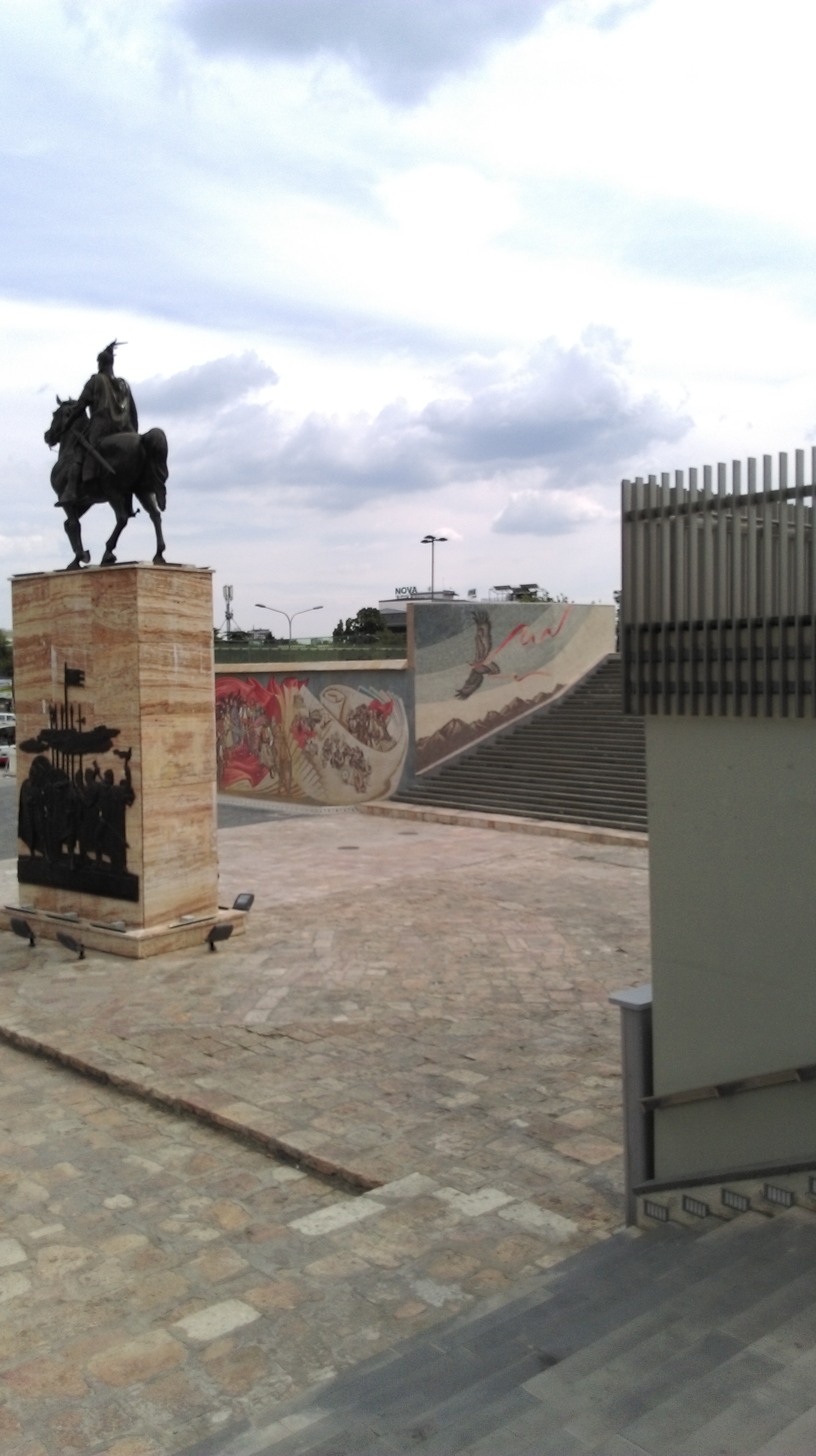
Skanderbeg square

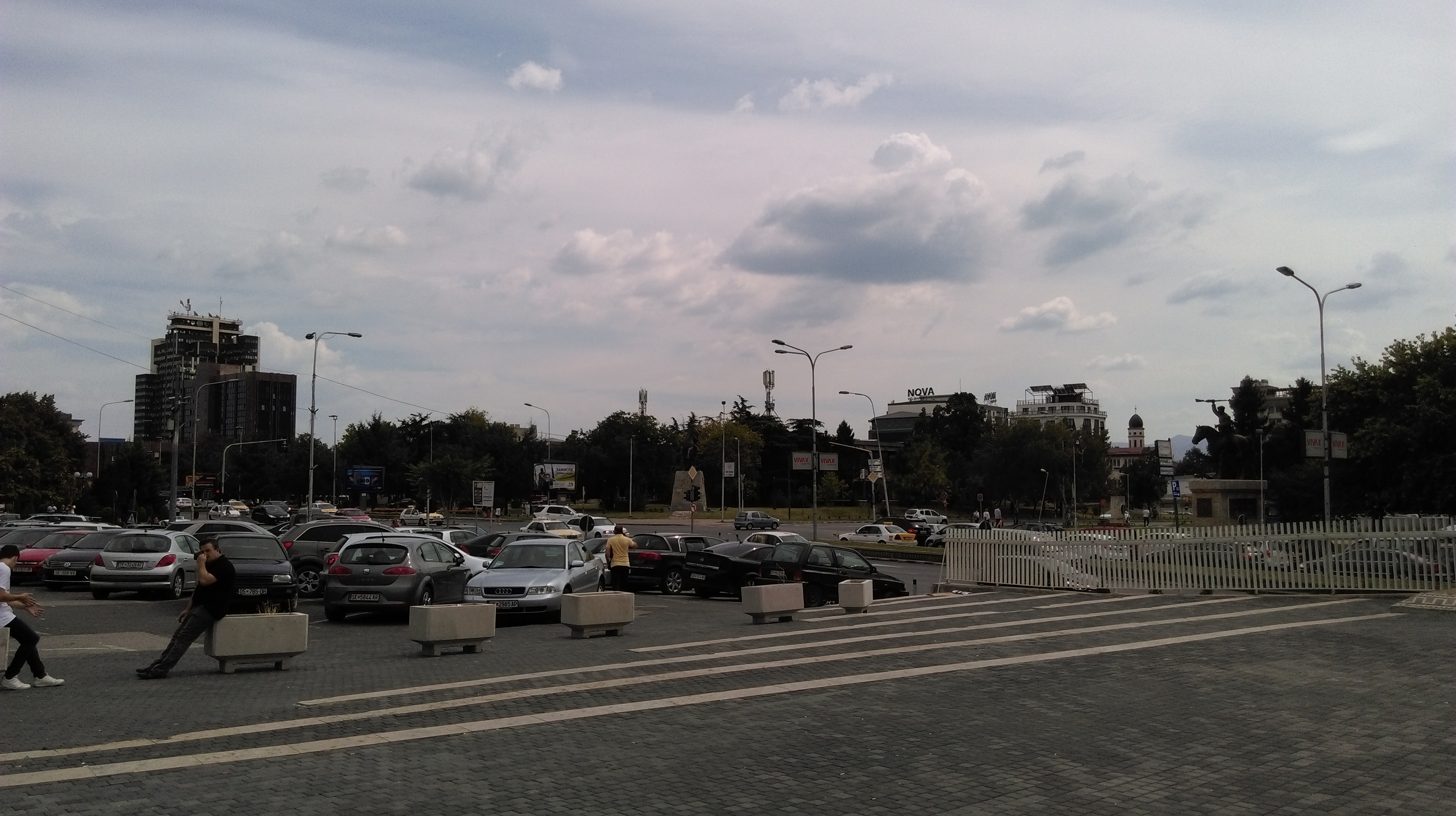
Carpark of Skanderbeg square

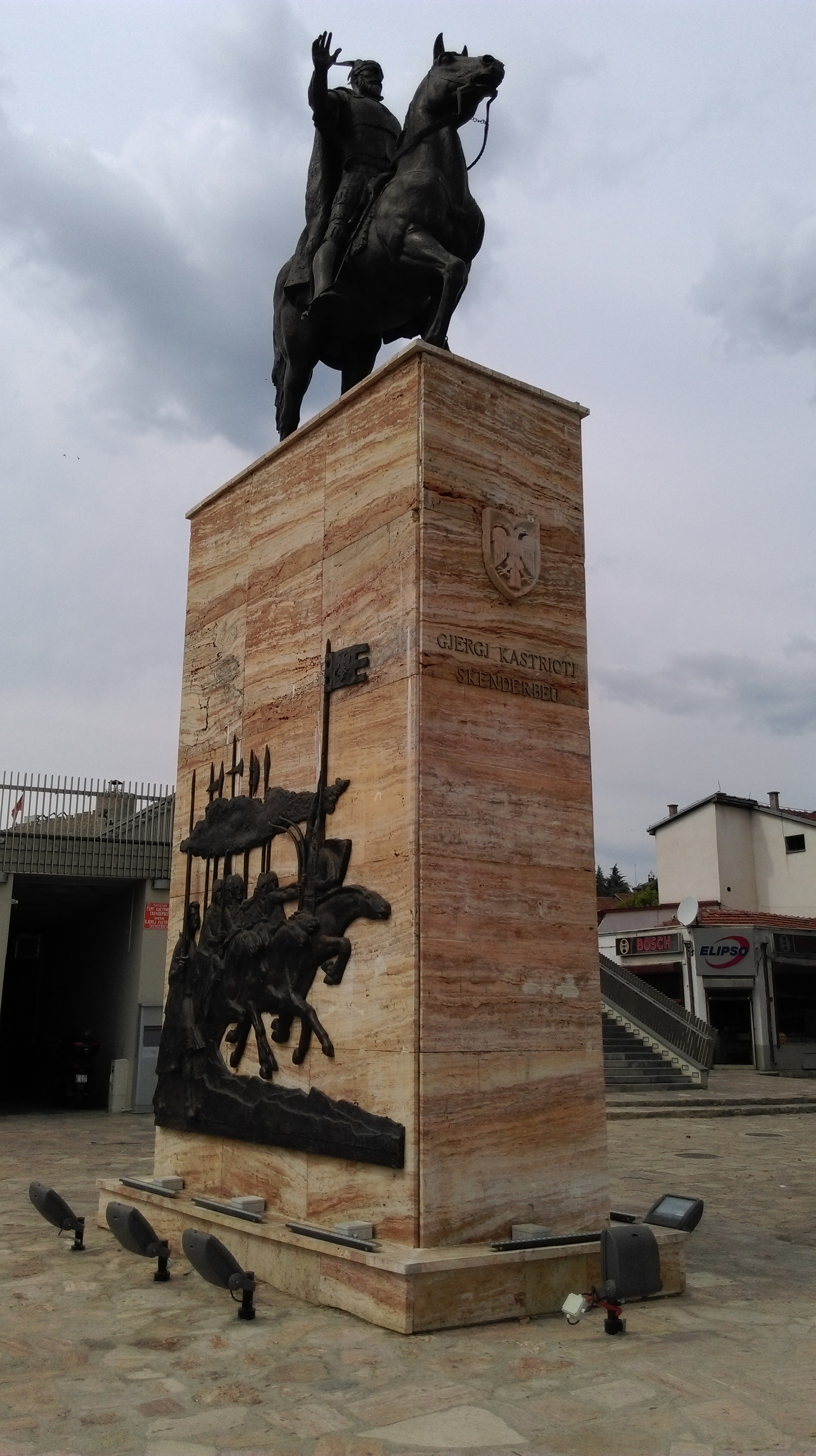
Skanderbeg statue on new pedestal

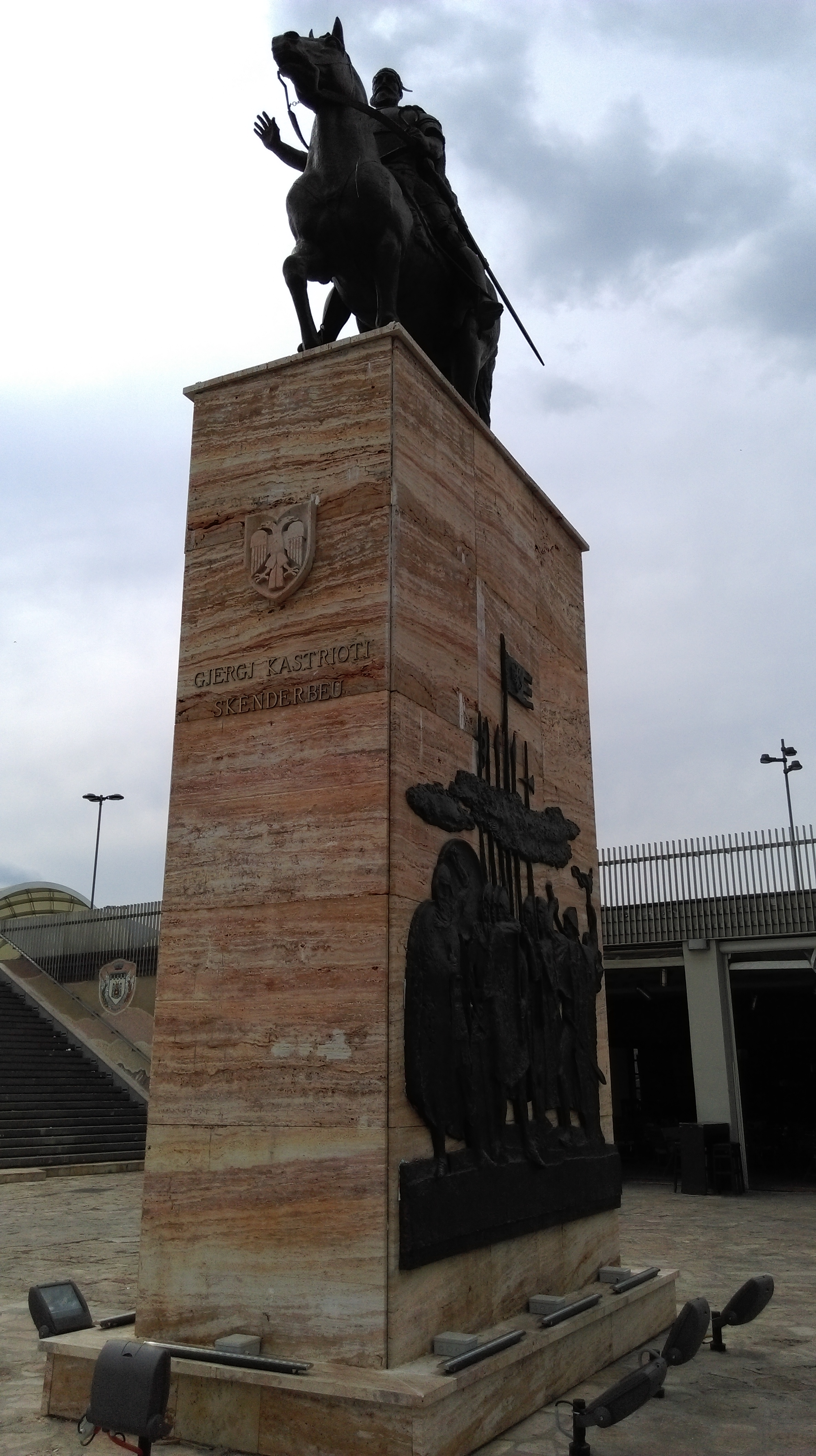
Skanderbeg statue on new pedestal

== See also ==
- Skanderbeg Square in Tiranë, Albania
- Skanderbeg Square in Pristina, Kosovo
