= Krujë Watchtower =

11th-century watchtower in Albania

- Kulla e Kalasë së Krujës
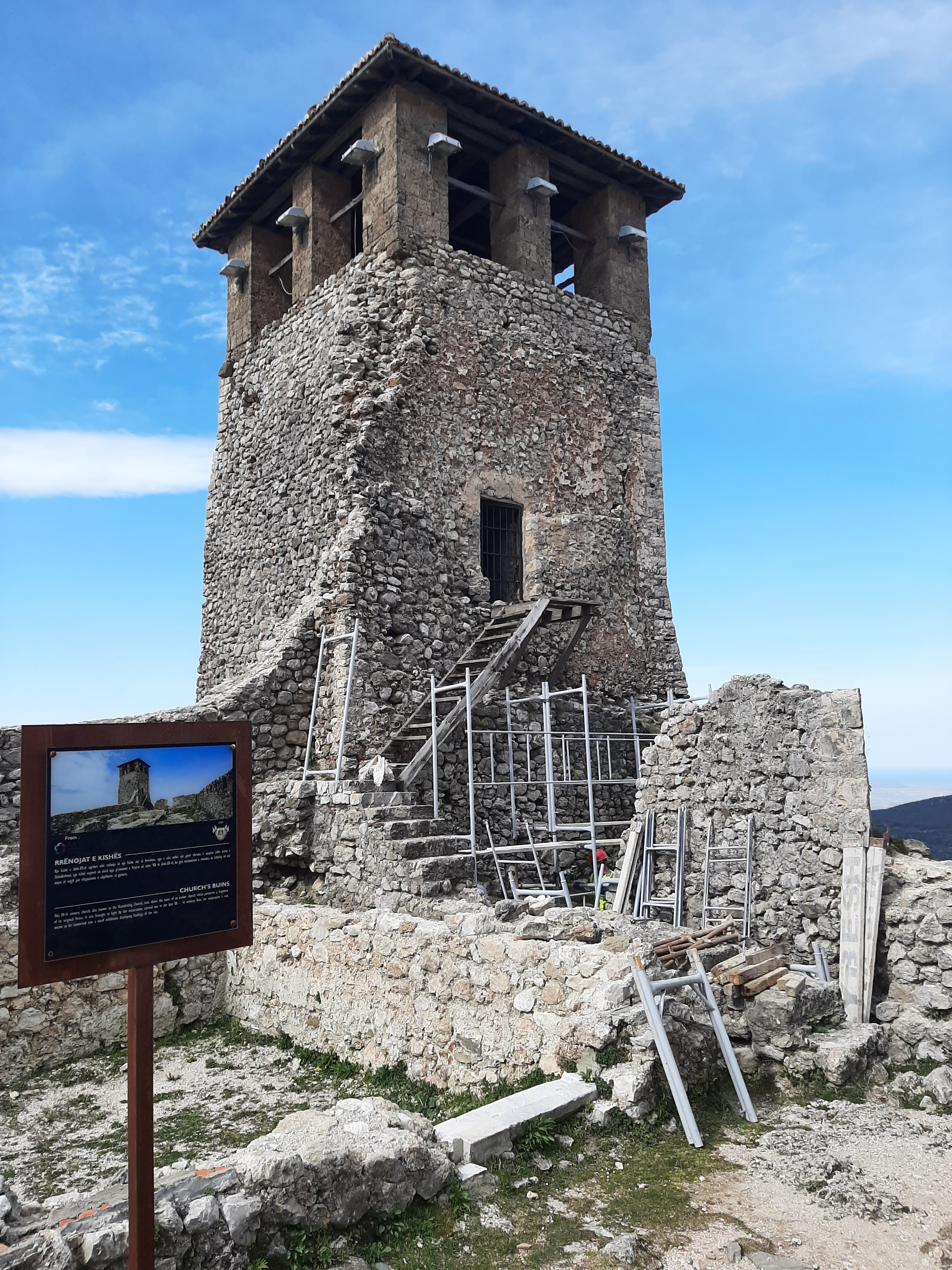
- Watchtower of Krujë
- 41.50780°N 19.79500°E
- Type: Watchtower
- Location: Krujë, Albania

History
- Built: 11th century

Site notes
- Height: 17.2 m (56 ft)
- Owner: Municipality of Krujë

Cultural Monument of Albania
- Type: Cultural
- Criteria: Cat. I
- Designated: 16 October 1948; 15 January 1963; 10 June 1973

The Watchtower of Krujë (Albanian: Kulla e Kalasë së Krujës) is a monument of cultural heritage located in Krujë, Albania. It was first recognized as a cultural heritage site by the Institute of Sciences through decision no. 95 on October 16, 1948. Subsequent designations were made by the rectorate of the State University of Tirana under decision no. 6 on January 15, 1963 and by the Ministry of Education and Culture via reference no. 1886 on June 10, 1973.

== History ==
The Fortress of Krujë, situated on a rocky ridge, separated from the mountain of the same name and the nearby hill formations, is a fortress with notable architectural features. At its highest point, a small section was constructed to serve as a fortified redoubt and the seat of the feudal lord. The external perimeter of this section, which coincides with the fortress’ walls, is bordered by sharp, unclimbable rocks. Within the internal dividing wall, two quadrangular towers were built.

One of these towers, located at the corner, bears evidence of multiple construction phases. When this part of the fortification lost its defensive function, it was adapted into a clock tower. English artist Edward Lear captured the clock tower in several watercolor drawings of Krujë during his visit on September 29–30, 1848. The clock tower is mentioned in the works of various Albanian scholars, including Edith Durham and Austrian consul Theodor Anton Ippen, in the early 20th century.

Originally constructed between the 11th and 12th centuries (or possibly earlier), it is one of the oldest observation towers still standing in the country. Various authors have described it as a bell tower, which later gained its clock function in the 17th century. Due to its strategic location and design, the tower seamlessly transitioned to its new role as a civic clock, serving the local bazaar and town residents.

== Architecture ==
Typologically a type II clock tower, it is characterized by two floors and classified as the second subvariant of the first variant of this type. (Note: A type II clock tower consists of two floors. The first floor is tall and enclosed by sturdy stone walls, providing space for the movement of the weight stones. The second floor is open, supported by four wooden or stone columns, topped with a roof.)

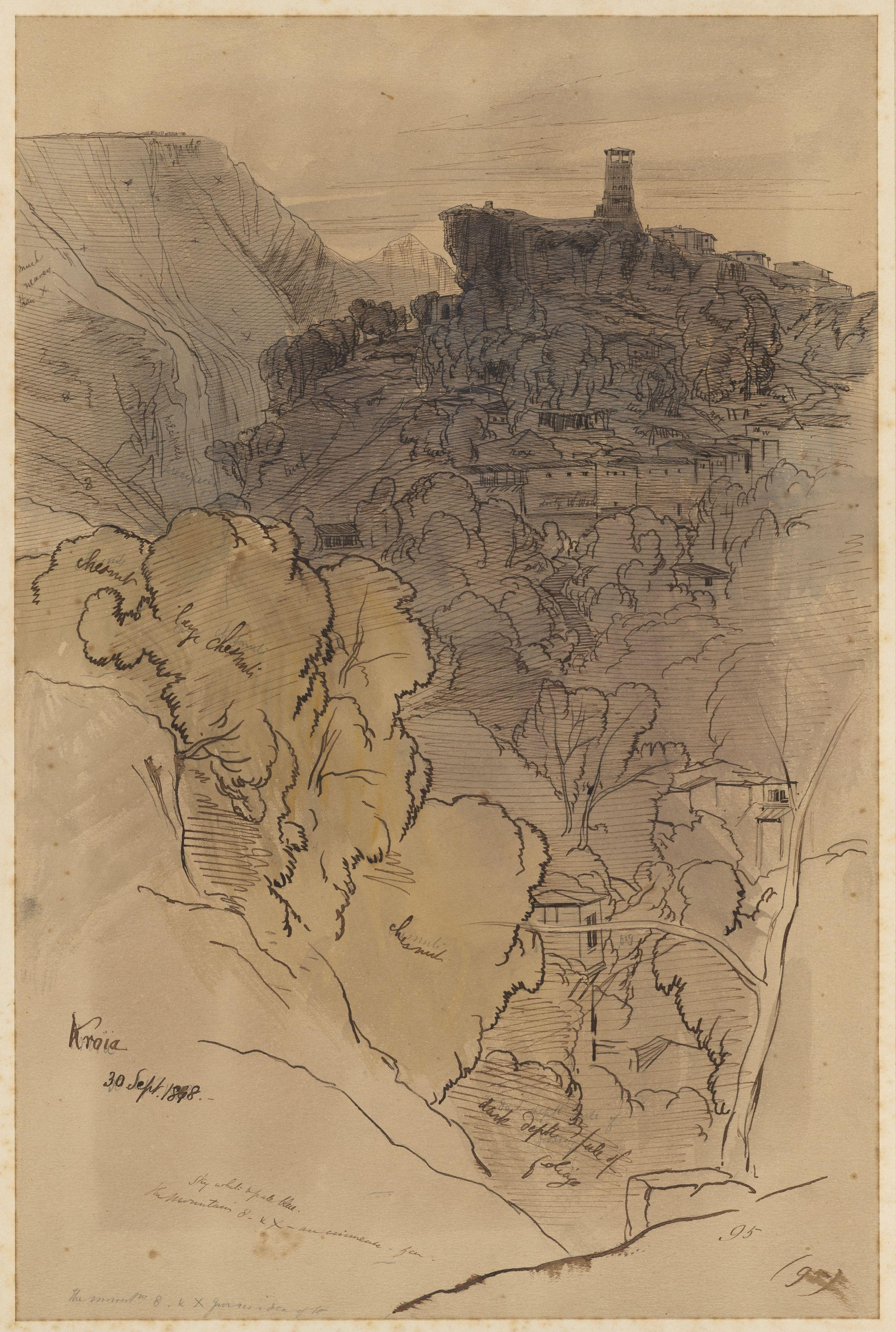
A watercolor drawing of the watchtower by Edward Lear (September 30, 1848)

The tower's height varies depending on the terrain. On the southwest-facing side, the height from the base to the rooftop is 15.75 m (51.7 ft), while the northwest-facing side reaches 17.2 m (56 ft). The tower's structure transitions from a pyramidal shape at the base to a prismatic form with a square plan at the top. Its lower section measures 7.8 × 8.05 meters, above the base on the southwest side. The upper open area measures 6.02 × 6.07 meters. The masonry material is primarily composed of limestone bound with mortar, with some sections incorporating bricks. The walls are notably thick, with the lower section being 1.9–2.35 meters while the midsections are 1.16–1.84 meters in thickness. Quadrangular columns support the open bell area. End columns measure 1 × 1 meters, while intermediate columns are 0.7 × 0.8 meters. Above, wooden beams reinforce the structure.

The tower has two entrances, one facing southwest and the other northeast – a rarity, as most clock towers typically have a single entrance.

The fortress, including the clock tower, sustained significant damage during the powerful earthquake of 1617.

=== Construction phases ===
The tower encapsulates all construction phases of the fortress, offering a detailed timeline of its evolution.

The initial construction phase is evident on its northern side, where slightly worked stonemasonry combined with rows of bricks dates back to the 11th century. Archaeological surveys reveal that the tower’s base was originally larger than its upper structure, with the lower portion built in a pyramidal shape. However, no information has survived regarding the form of the tower’s upper section during this period.

The lower portions of the northern and western sides are constructed with stonemasonry interspersed with brick fragments. According to Stilian Adhami, this construction style predates the Ottoman invasion, further confirming its early origins.

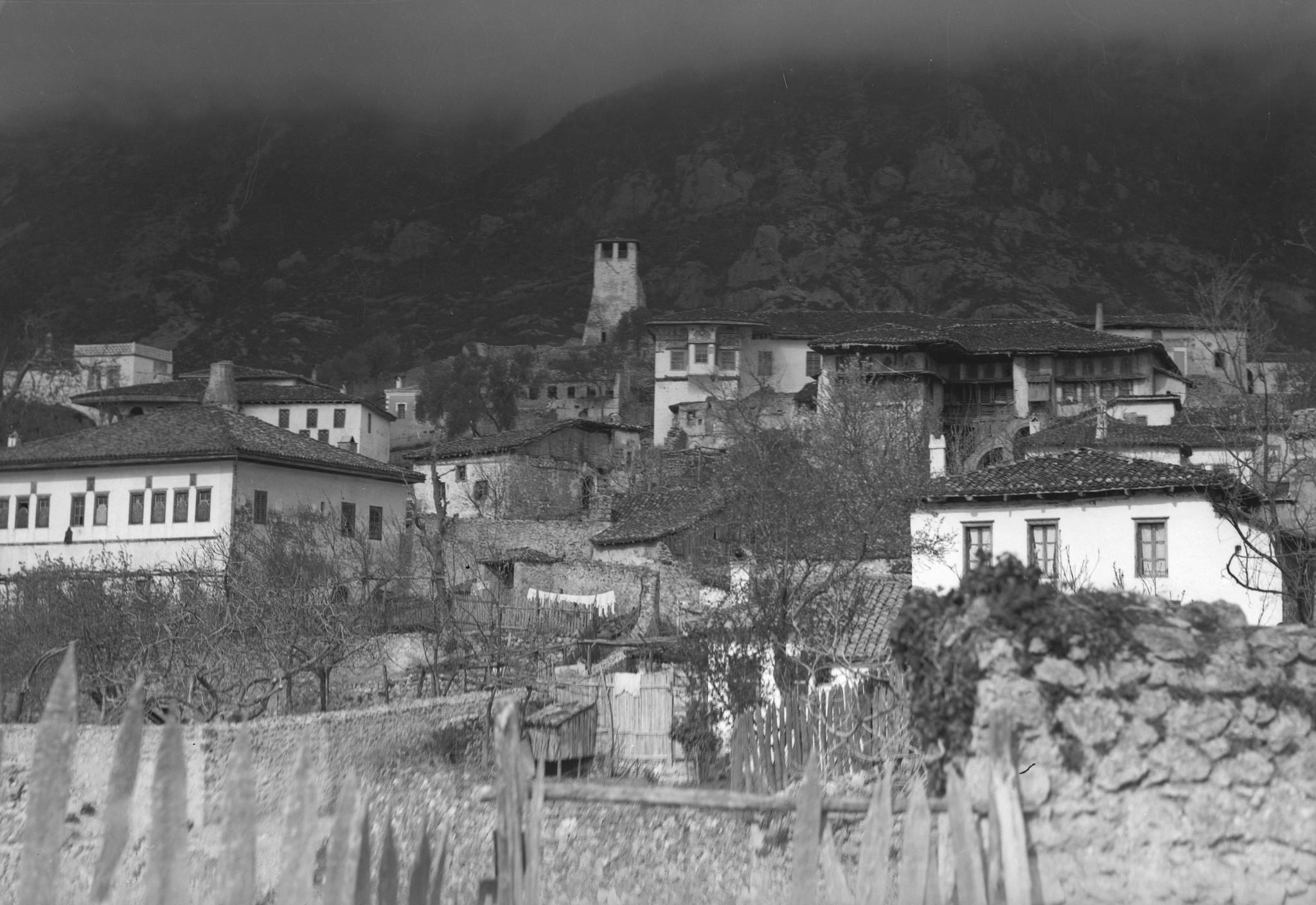
A photograph of the watchtower and Krujë fortress in 1908, by Kel Marubi.

The second construction phase, identified through masonry analysis on the southwest side, dates to the 13th–14th centuries. This phase features the cloisonné technique, a construction style commonly seen in various types of buildings across Albania.

The 17th century marked another significant phase in the tower’s history. Following the devastating earthquake of 1617, the tower was repurposed as a clock tower. Modifications during this period included structural changes to accommodate its new civic function.

A graphic illustration of Krujë fortress from 1866 provides valuable documentation of the latter phase, where it appears that the bell chamber was supported by eight wooden columns, arranged symmetrically on all four sides of the tower. These columns were connected by wooden arches, creating an open structure topped by a hemispherical dome-shaped roof. This design differs significantly from earlier depictions and suggests a reconstruction of the bell chamber sometime after the damage from when the earthquake occurred.

=== The Bell ===
The watchtower's bell shares stylistic and inscriptive similarities with bells crafted by master Luca of Venice in 1317 and 1318, leading researchers to date it to the first half of the 14th century.

A bronze bell from 1462, bearing two monograms and contemporaneous with the time of Skanderbeg, measures 0.44 m in diameter, 0.47 m in height to the top and 0.58 m in total height. This bell, once part of Shtjefën Gjeçovi’s collection, was reportedly used during Skanderbeg’s campaigns to rally troops for war or celebrate victories. Gjeçovi’s notes indicate it originated from the bell tower of Shën Ndreu’s Church in Krujë. Today, it is housed in the National Museum “Gjergj Kastrioti Skënderbeu”.

A third bell, described by Alexandre Degrand, was said to have been moved to Prezë for use in the clock tower there. However, its current whereabouts remain unknown.

A fourth bell, originally from the Church of Shna Ndou in Laç, was removed during the widespread destruction of religious monuments in 1967 and installed in Krujë's clock tower. This bell remained in use until 1997, when a fire partially damaged the tower and the bell disappeared. In 2013, Tomorr Merlika, a local resident, returned the bell to the Directorate of Cultural Heritage in Tirana, where it is now preserved.

=== Restorative interventions ===
The clock tower sustained significant damage during the earthquake of April 15, 1979, leading to restoration efforts in 1981. Although initial plans proposed reconstructing the pyramidal base and redesigning the upper section with eight arches, the council overseeing the project ultimately chose to maintain the tower’s existing structure.

After the earthquake on November 26, 2019, CHwB Albania prepared an emergency stabilization plan for the watchtower, which was approved on January 15, 2021 (Decision No. 8). The reinforcement work, funded by the Prince Claus Fund for Culture and Development, commenced in April 2021.
