= Fethiye Mosque (Krujë) =

Former mosque in Krujë, Durrës County, Albania

- Xhamia e Fet'hijes
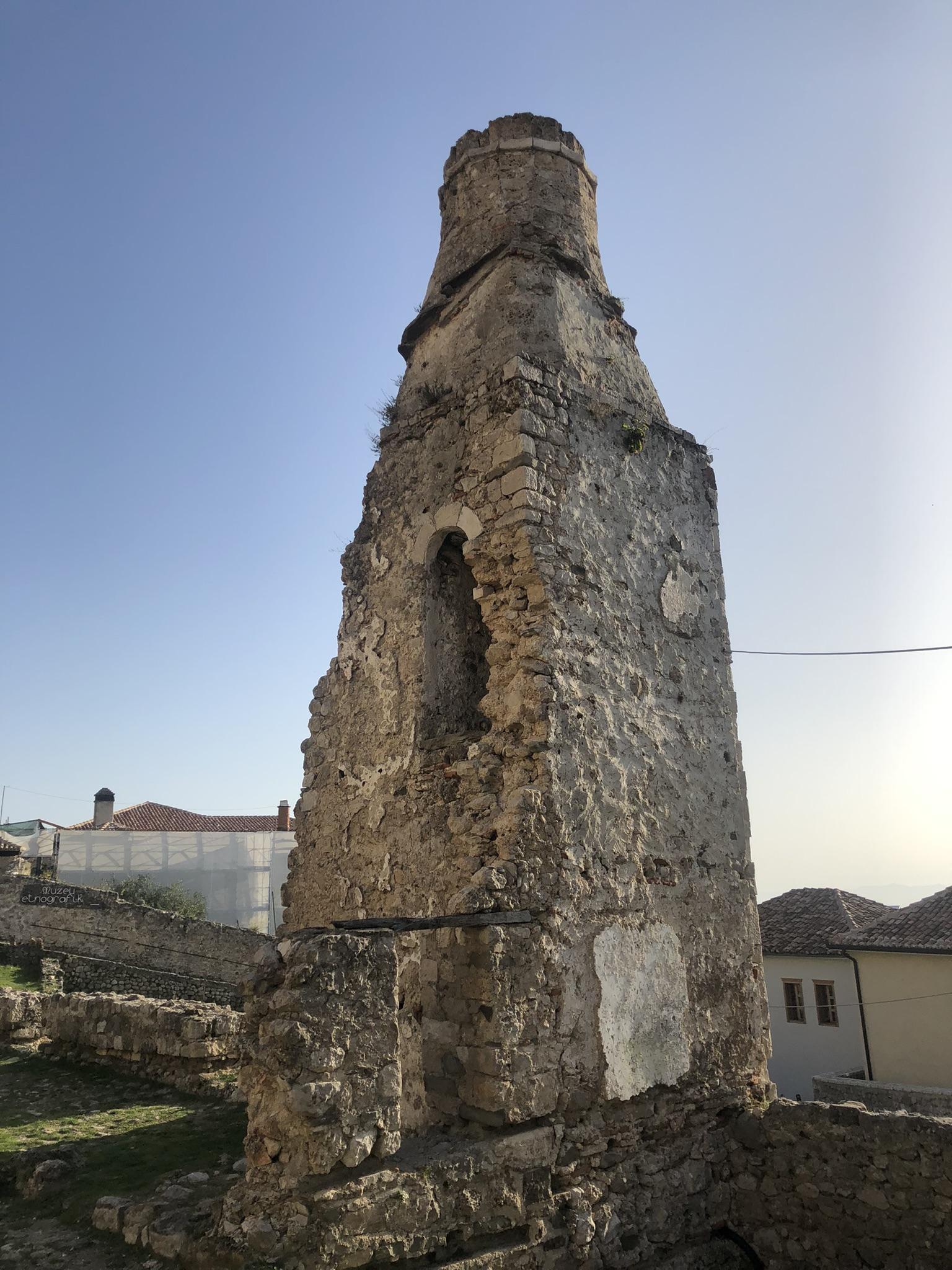
- The remnants of the minaret of the former mosque, in 2022

- Location of the former mosque in Albania

Religion
- Affiliation: Islam (former)
- Ecclesiastical or organisational status: Mosque (1481–1937)
- Status: Destroyed (partial ruinous state)

Location
- Location: Krujë Castle, Krujë
- Country: Albania
- Interactive map of Fethiye Mosque
- Coordinates: 41°30′26″N 19°47′37″E

Architecture
- Type: Islamic architecture
- Style: Ottoman
- Completed: c. 1481 CE
- Destroyed: from 1937
- Materials: Stone

Cultural Monument of Albania
- Official name: Sultan Mehmed Fatih Mosque of Krujë

The Fethiye Mosque (Albanian: Xhamia e Fet'hijes), officially the Sultan Mehmed Fatih Mosque of Krujë (Xhamia e Sulltan Mehmed Fatihut), is a former mosque in a ruinous state, located inside the Krujë Castle of Krujë, Durrës County, Albania. Completed in c. 1481 CE, during the Ottoman era, the former mosque was destroyed in the mid- 20th century. It is situated near the entrance of the Skanderbeg Museum. The former mosque was designated as a Cultural Monument of Albania.

== History ==
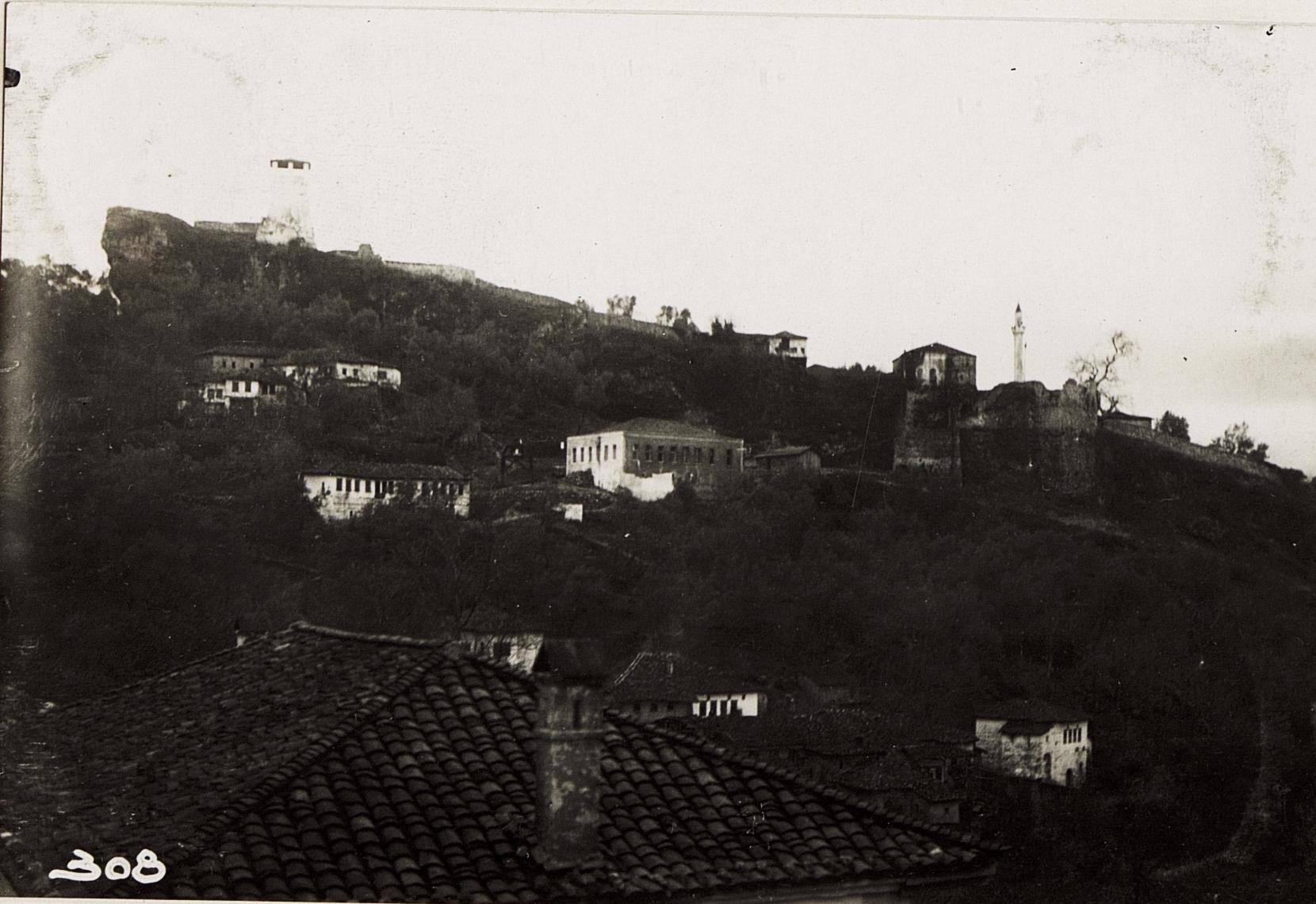
The fortress with its then existing mosque and minaret (on the right on the top of the hill) in 1917

The Sultan Mehmed Fatih Mosque was built before 1481 and named after the Ottoman Sultan Mehmed II (also called "the Conqueror"). After its partial destruction in 1831, the mosque was rebuilt for the local Albanian population under the reign of the Sultan Mahmud II.

In 1917, the mosque's minaret, famed for its beauty, collapsed due to a storm. Until 1937, the mosque was used a house of worship for the Albanian Muslims. During the World War II, the mosque was used for profane purposes, including the storage of ammunition. The mosque again decayed during the time of the Communist dictator Enver Hoxha.

Only the lower parts of the walls and the minaret remain.

== Gallery ==
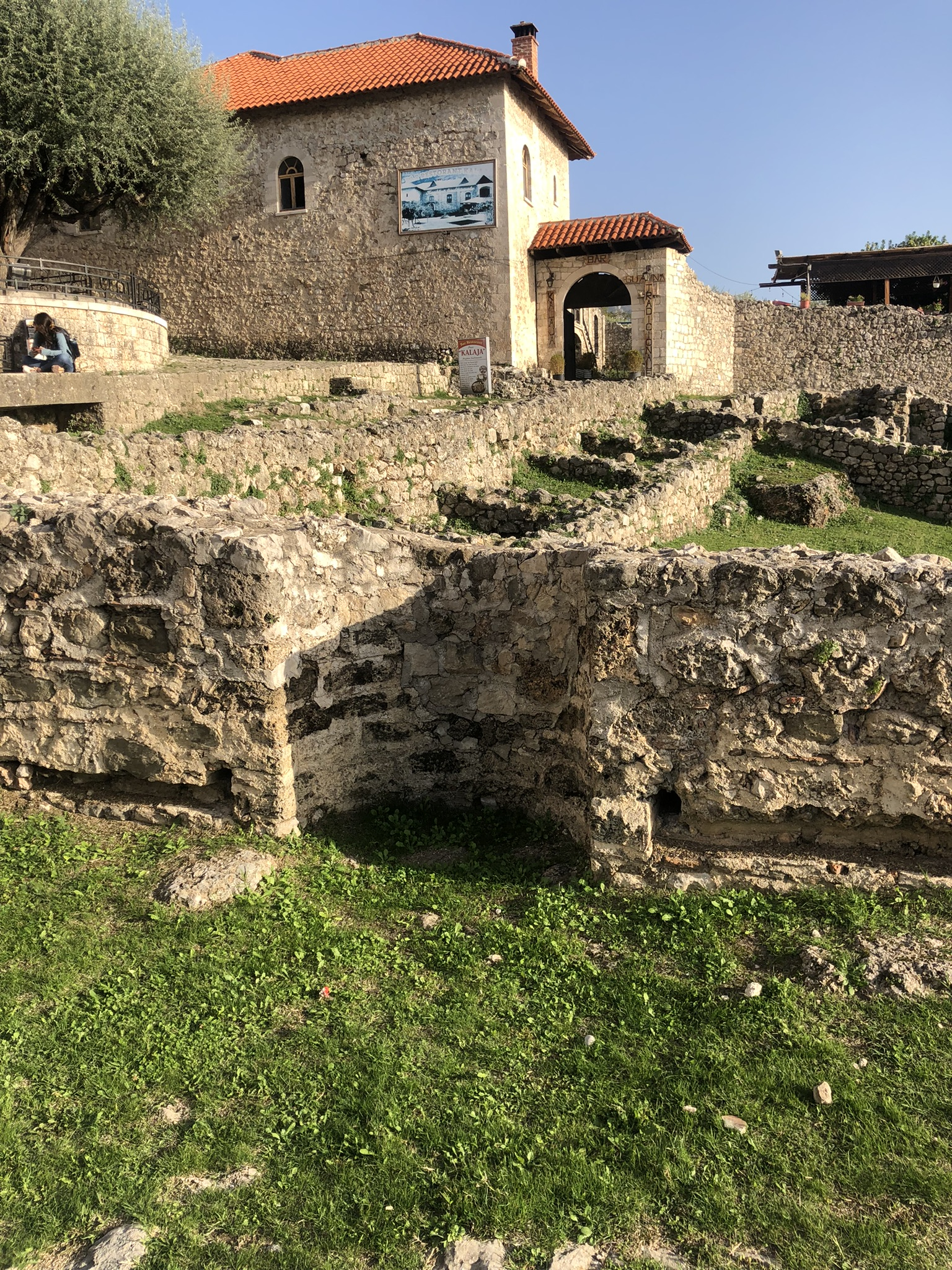
Mihrab of the former mosque

Man praying in the ruins of the former mosque

== See also ==
- Islam in Albania
- List of mosques in Albania
- List of Religious Cultural Monuments of Albania
