= Pirro Vaso =

Albanian architect (born 1948)

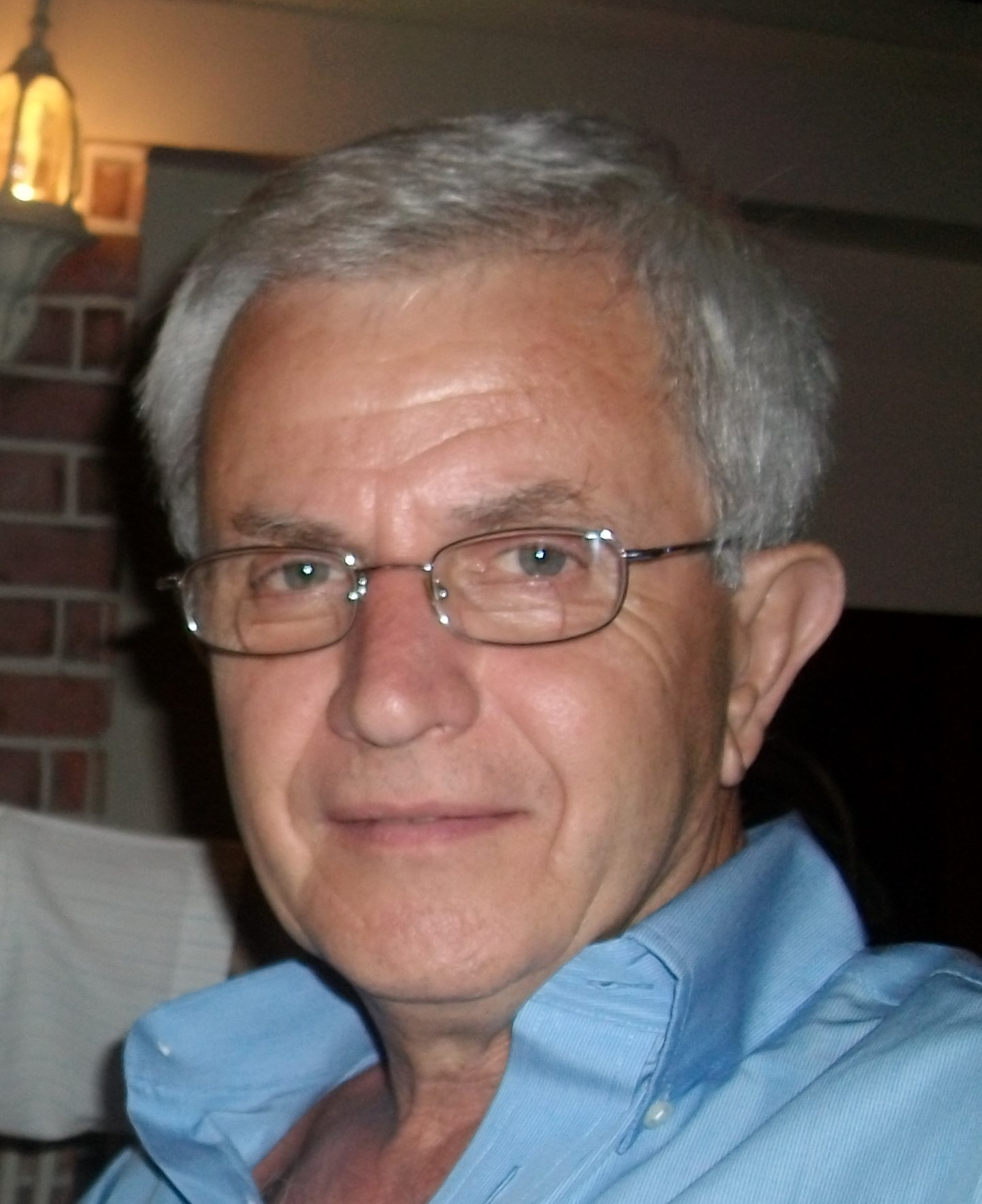
Pirro Vaso in 2009

Pirro Vaso is an Albanian architect.

Born on 25 August 1948, in Tirana, Albania, Vaso is one of the principal architects of the Skanderbeg Museum in Krujë (1982) and of the Pyramid of Tirana (1988). For both of these, Vaso was awarded with the Albanian National Republic Award. For the period of 1972-1991, Vaso worked in developing projects in Architecture and Urban Design as member of the largest state-owned company of architectural studies and design in Albania. His architectural career in Albania included several projects of public and cultural buildings as well as residential, educational, and industrial facilities. In addition to being an important figure in architecture in Albania, Vaso has taught at University of Tirana and was the Primary Urban Planning Adviser at the Ministry of Tourism of Albania in the period 1991-1996.

In 1996, Vaso emigrated to the United States with his wife Sier and two daughters Kleitia and Jora and lived in Athens, Georgia, until 2015 where he worked in several private architectural firms and local government in the designing of commercial, educational, multi-family residential, religious and cultural buildings. In 1997, Vaso received the local "Mathis Award" for the project Facility Space Study, Town & Gown Players, Inc., in Athens, Georgia. In 2015, Vaso retired and returned to his hometown of Tirana where he now teaches Architecture at Epoka University.
