= Fortress of Krujë =

Fortress in Krujë, Albania

Krujë Fortress Kalaja e Krujës
- Krujë, Albania
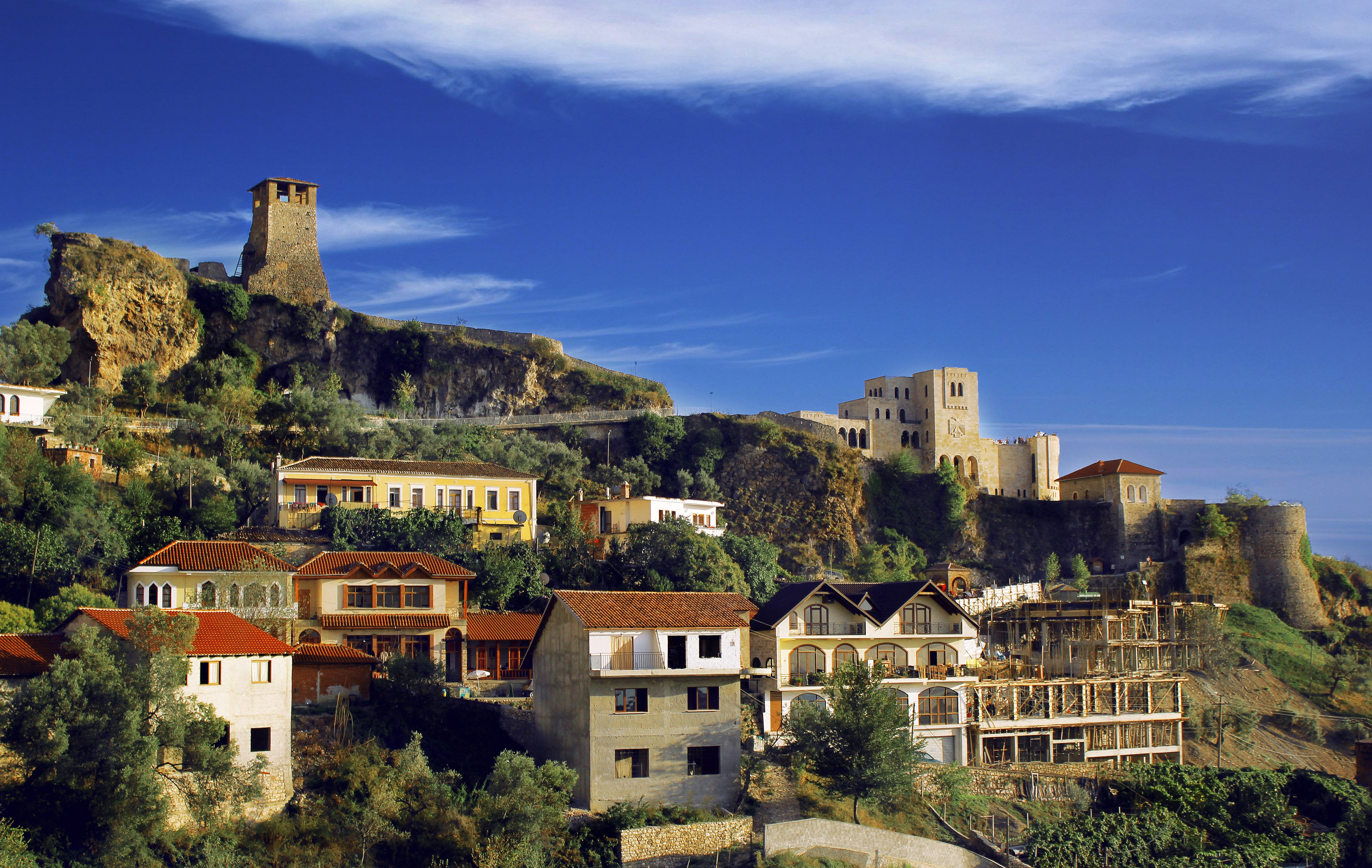
- Krujë Fortress seen from a distance

Site information
- Owner: Albania
- Controlled by: Byzantine Empire; Principality of Arbanon; Kingdom of Albania; Principality of Albania; Principality of Kastrioti; League of Lezhë; Ottoman Empire; Albania
- Open to the public: Yes

Location
- Location within Albania
- Coordinates: 41°30′25″N 19°47′38″E

Site history
- Built: 5th Century
- Battles/wars: Albanian Revolt of 1432–36; Siege of Krujë (1450); Siege of Krujë (1466–1467); Siege of Krujë (1467); Siege of Krujë (1477–1478)

The Fortress of Krujë (Albanian: Kalaja e Krujës) is a fortress in the city of Krujë, Albania and the center of Skanderbeg's rebellion against the Ottoman Empire. Inside the fortress is the Teqe of Dollme of the Bektashi (an Islamic Sufi sect), the National Skanderbeg Museum, the remains of the Fatih Sultan Mehmed mosque and its minaret, an ethnographic museum and a hammam (Turkish bathhouse).

== History ==
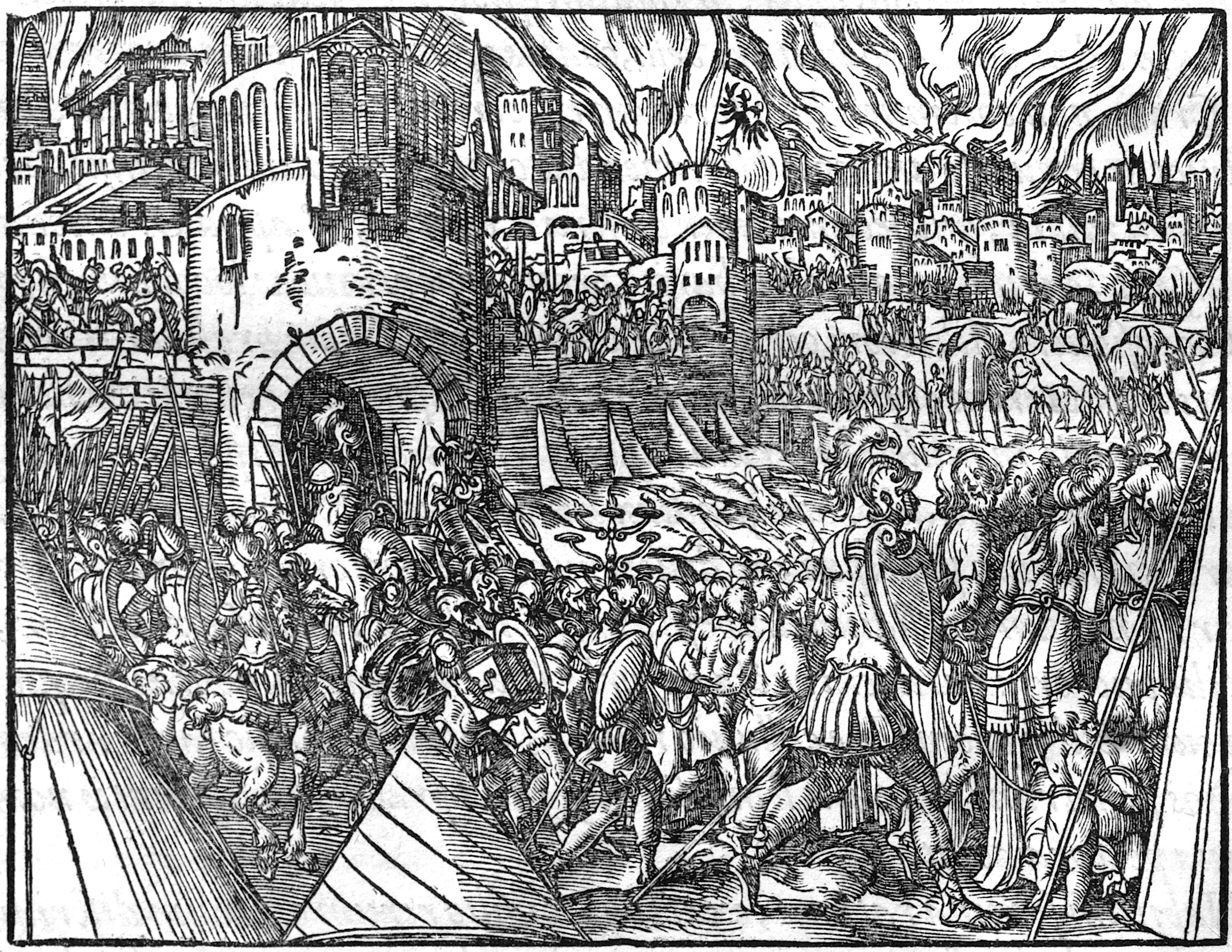
Carving Depicting the First Siege of Krujë by Jost Amman

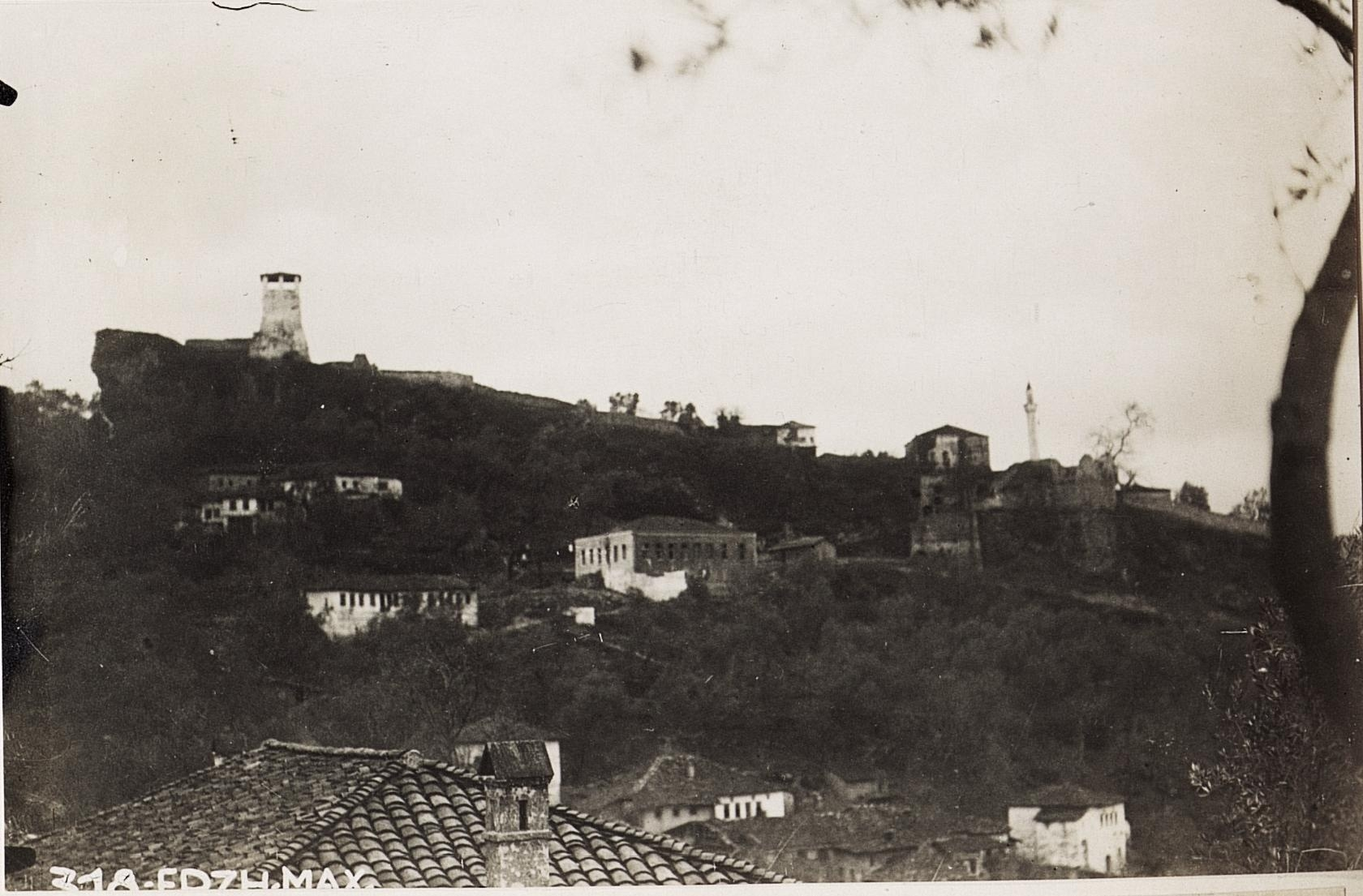
View of the fortress in 1917 with its then existing Fethiye Mosque (minaret on the right) and without the modern Scanderbeg Museum

Krujë fortress was built in the 5th or 6th century, perched above the city with the same name as today. During the Albanian Revolt of 1432-1436 the city was unsuccessfully besieged by Andrea Thopia and Ottoman rule was restored. After Skanderbeg's rebellion in 1443 the fortress withstood three massive sieges from the Turks respectively in 1450, 1466 and 1467 with garrisons usually no larger than 2,000-3,000 men under Skanderbeg's command. Mehmed II "The Conqueror" himself could not break the fortress' small defenses until 1478, 10 years after the death of Skanderbeg. Today it is a center of tourism in Albania, and a source of inspiration to Albanians. Krujë Fortress is situated at an elevation of 557 metres (1,827 ft).

== Museums inside the fortress ==
=== National Museum "Gjergj Kastrioti Skenderbeu" ===
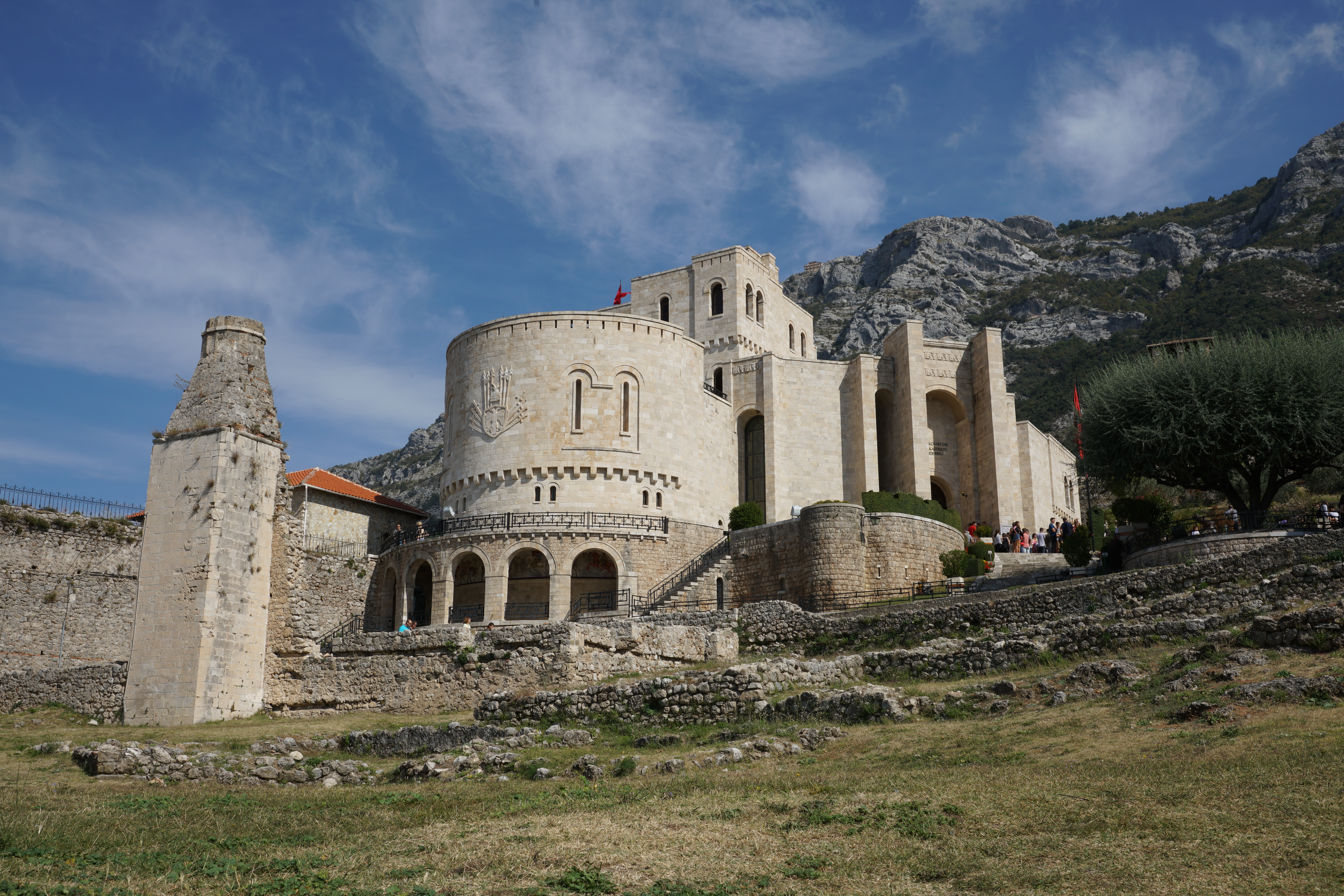
Skanderbeg Museum By Kruje Fortress

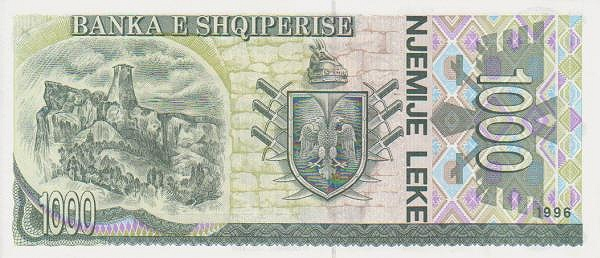
Kruja Fortress (left) on the reverse of a 1996 1000 Lekë banknote

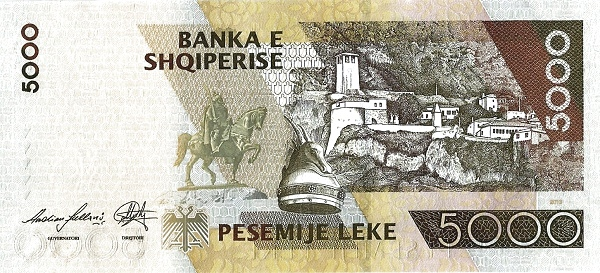
Kruja Fortress (right) on the reverse of a 2013 5000 Lekë banknote

The Albanian people are identified with the history of Kruje Fortress. This fortress is one of the most visited places in Albania. Within the fortress is located one of the main attractions, the National Museum "George Castroti Skanderbeg" (Muzeu Kombetar "Gjergj Kastrioti Skenderbeu" in Albanian). This museum was built in early 1980s by architects Pranvera Masha and Pirro Vaso. Inside the museum a lot of original bibliography, documents, objects and authentic reproductions that represent the history of Albanian people in the fifteenth century are displayed. This museum has become an icon of the city's skyline.

=== The Ethnographic Museum ===
Another attraction for tourists is the Ethnographic Museum, located in the south side of Krujë Fortress. This museum is designed based on a typical house of 19th century. It reveals the sustainable methods of tools, food, drink and furniture production in a typical household. There are also objects and old wood and metal supplies that represent the lifestyle back then in the fortress.

==== Legacy ====
The fortress is depicted on the reverse of the Albanian 1000 lekë banknote of 1992–1996, and of the 5000 lekë banknote issued since 1996.

== See also ==
- Krujë Watchtower
- List of castles in Albania
- Tourism in Albania
- Albanoi
- History of Albania
- Skanderbeg Museum
- Illyrians
