= Skanderbeg Museum =

Coordinates: 41.5075°N 19.7939°E

National History Museum "Gjergj Kastrioti Skënderbeu"
- Muzeu Historik Kombëtar "Gjergj Kastrioti Skënderbeu"
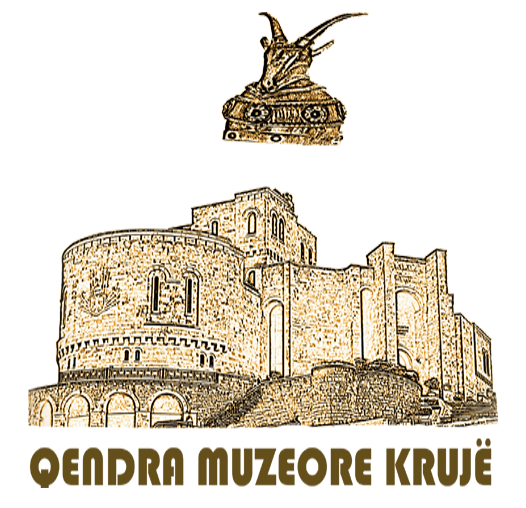

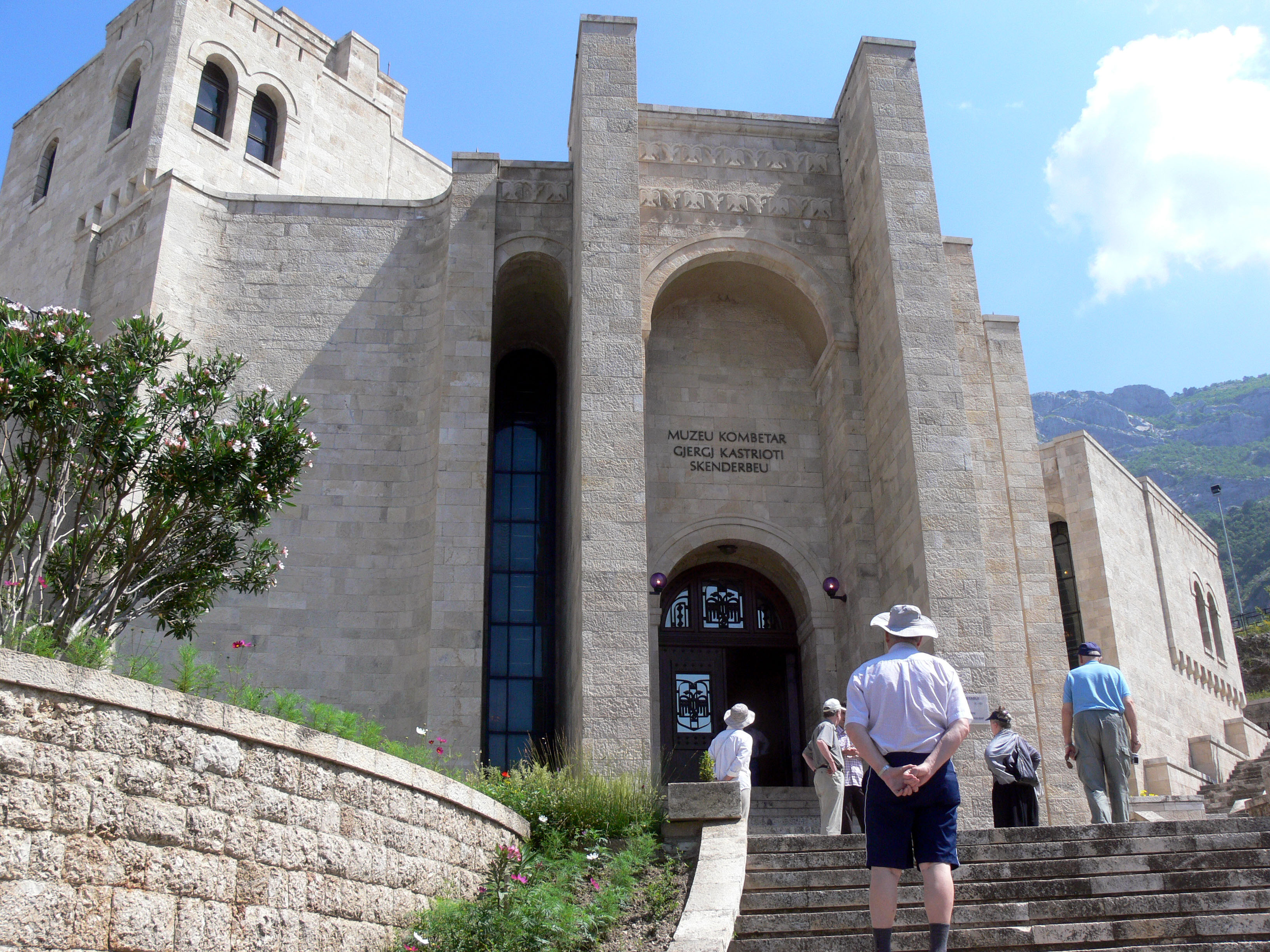
- Established: 1 November 1982; 43 years ago
- Location: Krujë, Albania
- Type: Historical museum
- Director: Mehdi Afizi
- Architects: Pirro Vaso, Pranvera Hoxha
- Website: muzeumet-kruje.com

The National History Museum "Gjergj Kastrioti Skënderbeu" (Albanian: Muzeu Historik Kombëtar "Gjergj Kastrioti Skënderbeu"), also known as the Skanderbeg Museum or the Kruja Museum, is located in Krujë and is one of the most important and visited museums in Albania. The museum was built at the end of the 1970s and was inaugurated on 1 November 1982. Its architecture was designed by architects Pirro Vaso and Pranvera Hoxha (the daughter of Enver Hoxha). Construction works were realized by a local team managed by Robert Kote. The museum has the character of a memorial, architecturally inspired by traditional Albanian stone towers and medieval Romanesque architecture. The name of the museum is in the honor of the Albanian national hero Gjergj Kastrioti Skënderbej.

The Krujë Castle, which houses the museum, is a historic citadel. Ottoman troops attacked it thrice, in 1450, 1466 and 1467, but failed to take control until a fourth siege in 1476. It was this impregnable fortress that helped George Kastrioti Skanderbeg defend Albania from the Ottoman invasion for more than two decades.

== Building ==
The Skanderbeg Museum project was based on the conceptual platform designed by Aleks Buda in September 1976, which was sent as a design assignment to the Institute of Studies and Projets (ISP) No.1 Tirana, under the direction of architect Pirro Vaso. After reviewing three variants, the ISP decided to continue the work on designing a building based on these variants and decided that the site where the museum would be built was in the interior of the walls of the old Kruja Castle. The design team consisted of Pirro Vaso, Pranvera Hoxha, F. Stermasi, K. Meka, L. Gashi, Gjarçani and R. Agalliu, who designed a building which would be stylistic to the Albanian medieval towers, mainly built in northern Albania. After the museum's draft idea was approved by the Ministry of Education and Culture, the ISP working group started work on the project implementation of this work. The works for the construction of the museum began in September 1978 and they were directed by Robert Kote. In March 1980, the Ministry of Education and Culture set up two working groups for the preparation of the museum content model, pavilions, mural paintings, and so on. The group of historians led by professor Kristo Frasheri and the group of painters led by Bashkim Ahmeti completed this design in the end of 1980.

On 1 November 1982, the museum opened to the public.

== Exhibits ==
The museum contains objects dating back to Skanderbeg's time. The exhibits have been arranged in a way that chronicles his life and military feats. Paintings, armor, and other artifacts dating back to his time have been exhibited to showcase one of the proudest periods of Albanian history. An interesting display is the replica of the hero's famous goat head-topped helmet, the original of which is on display at the Kunsthistorisches Museum. The memorial building was designed by Pirro Vaso and Pranvera Hoxha.

== Gallery ==
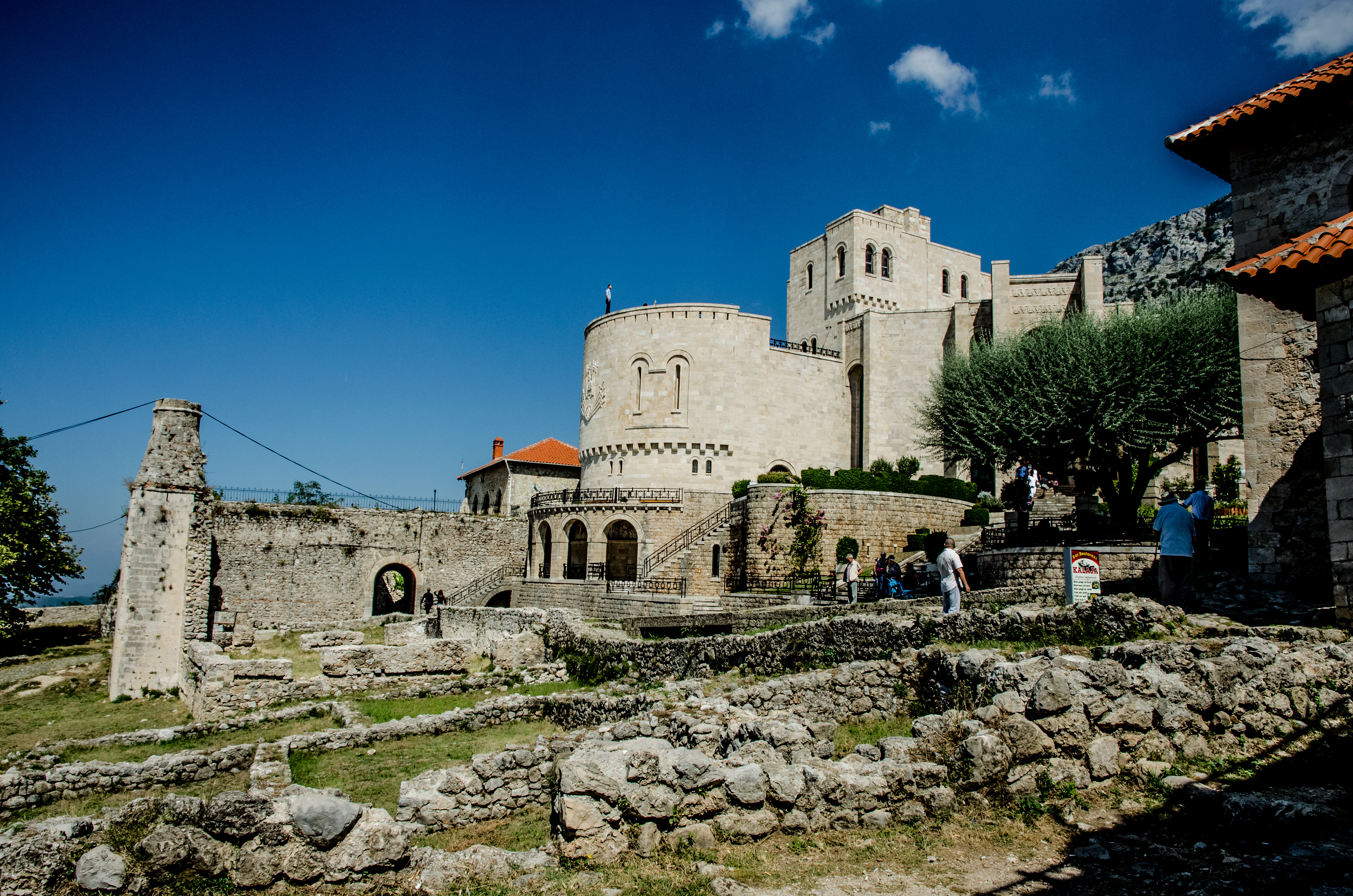
The National Museum "Gergj Kastrioti Skenderbeu" at the Krujë Castle

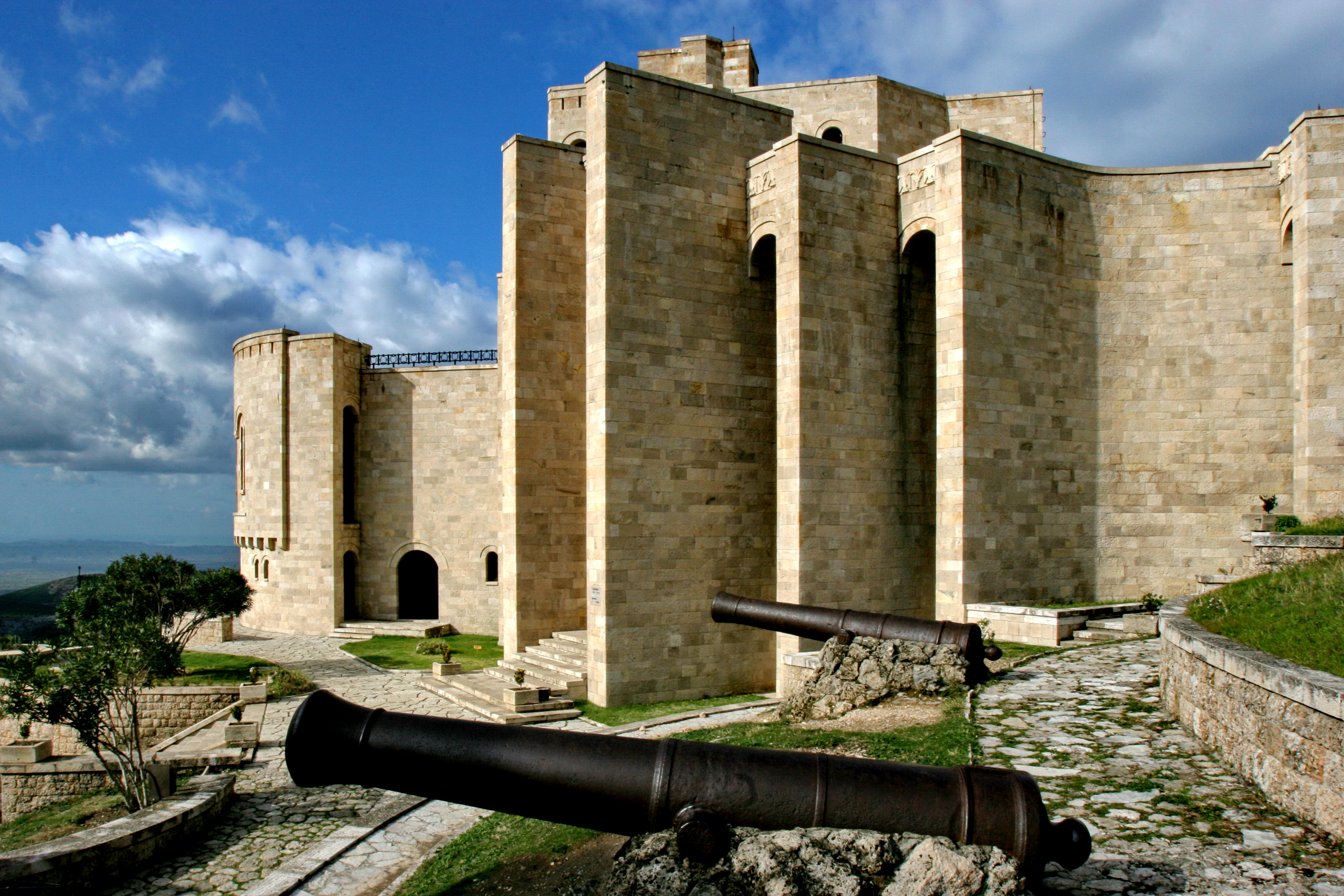
Medieval cannons

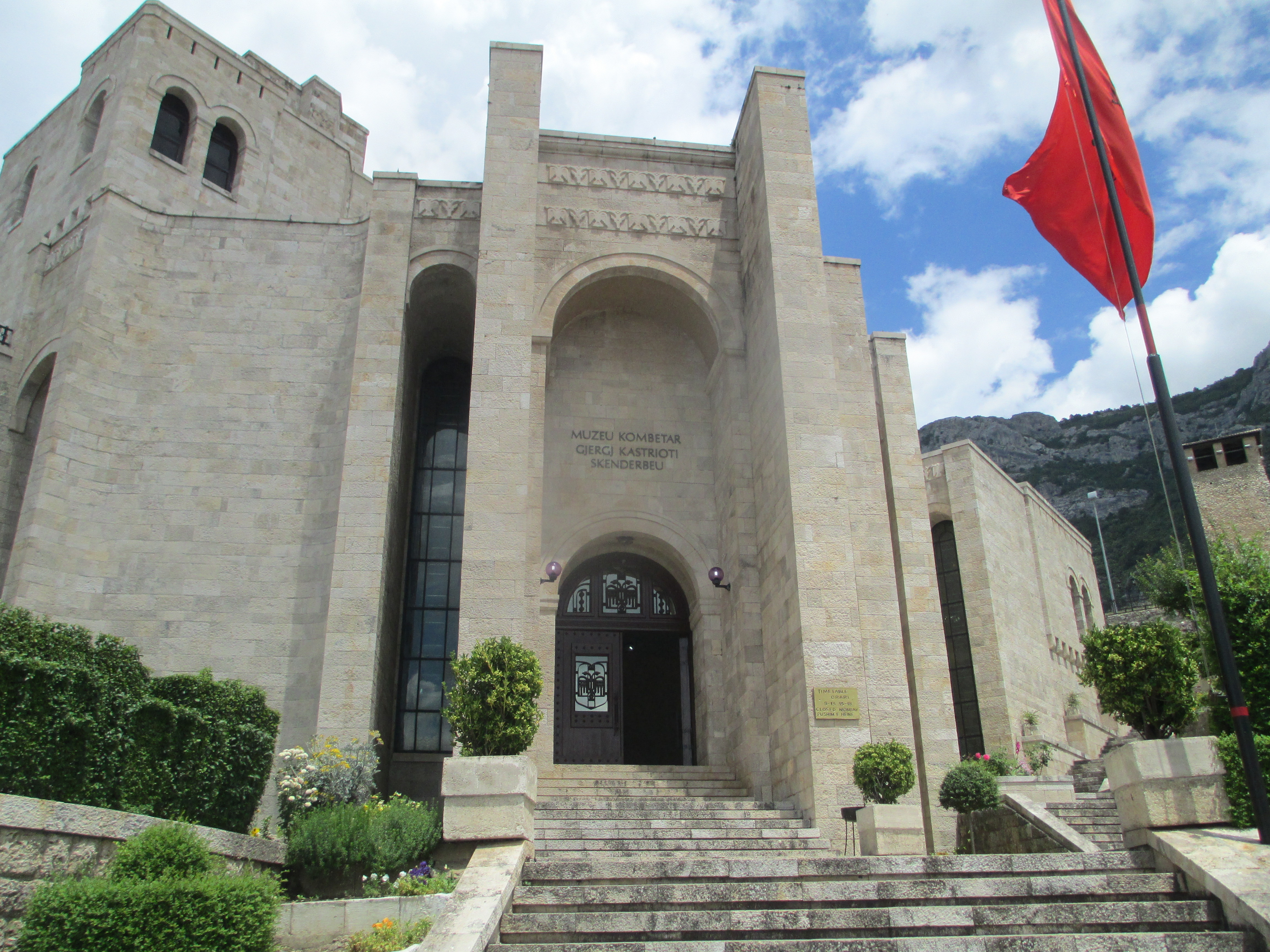
Front entrance of the museum

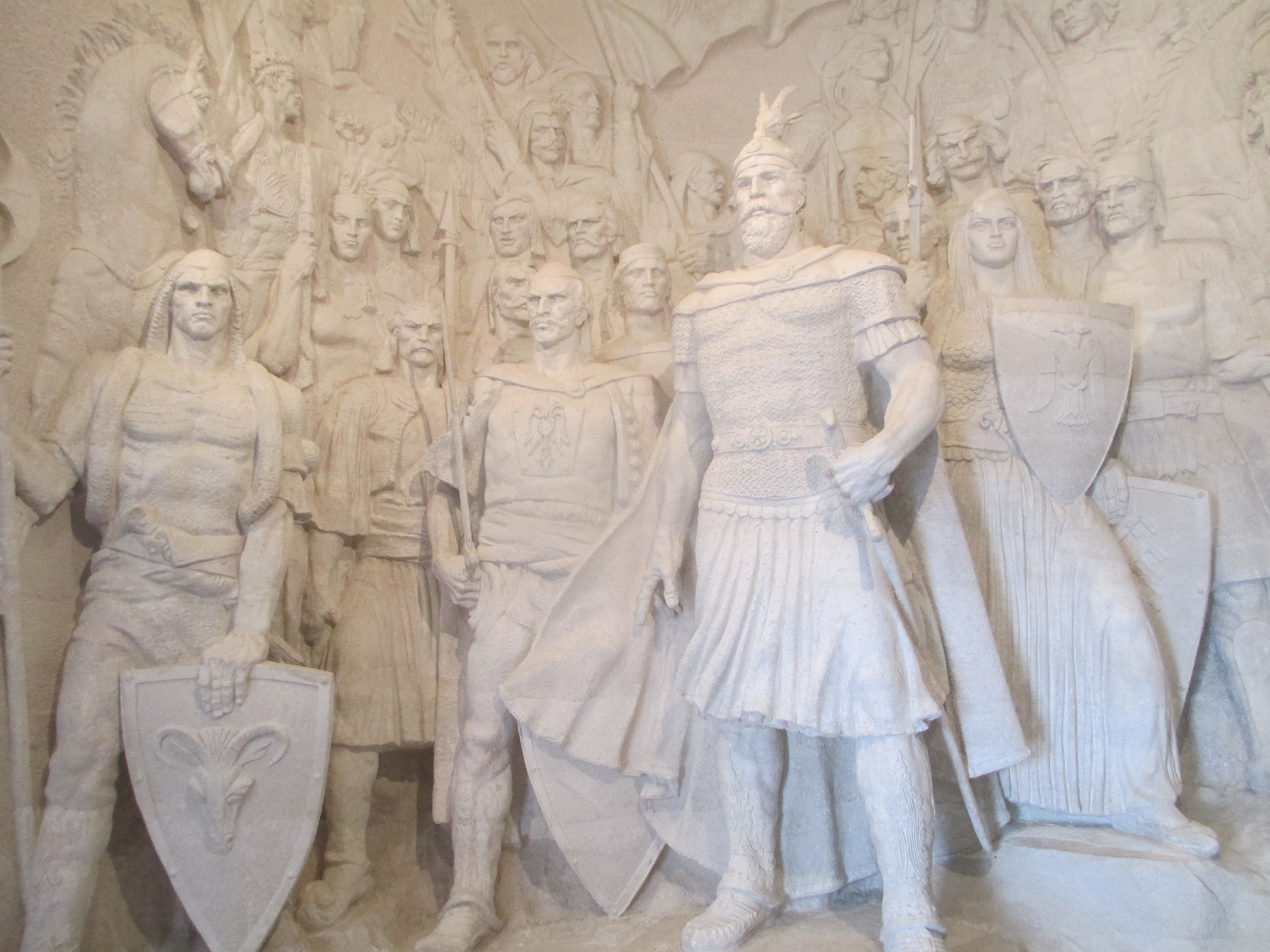
Skanderbeg and his warriors inside the museum

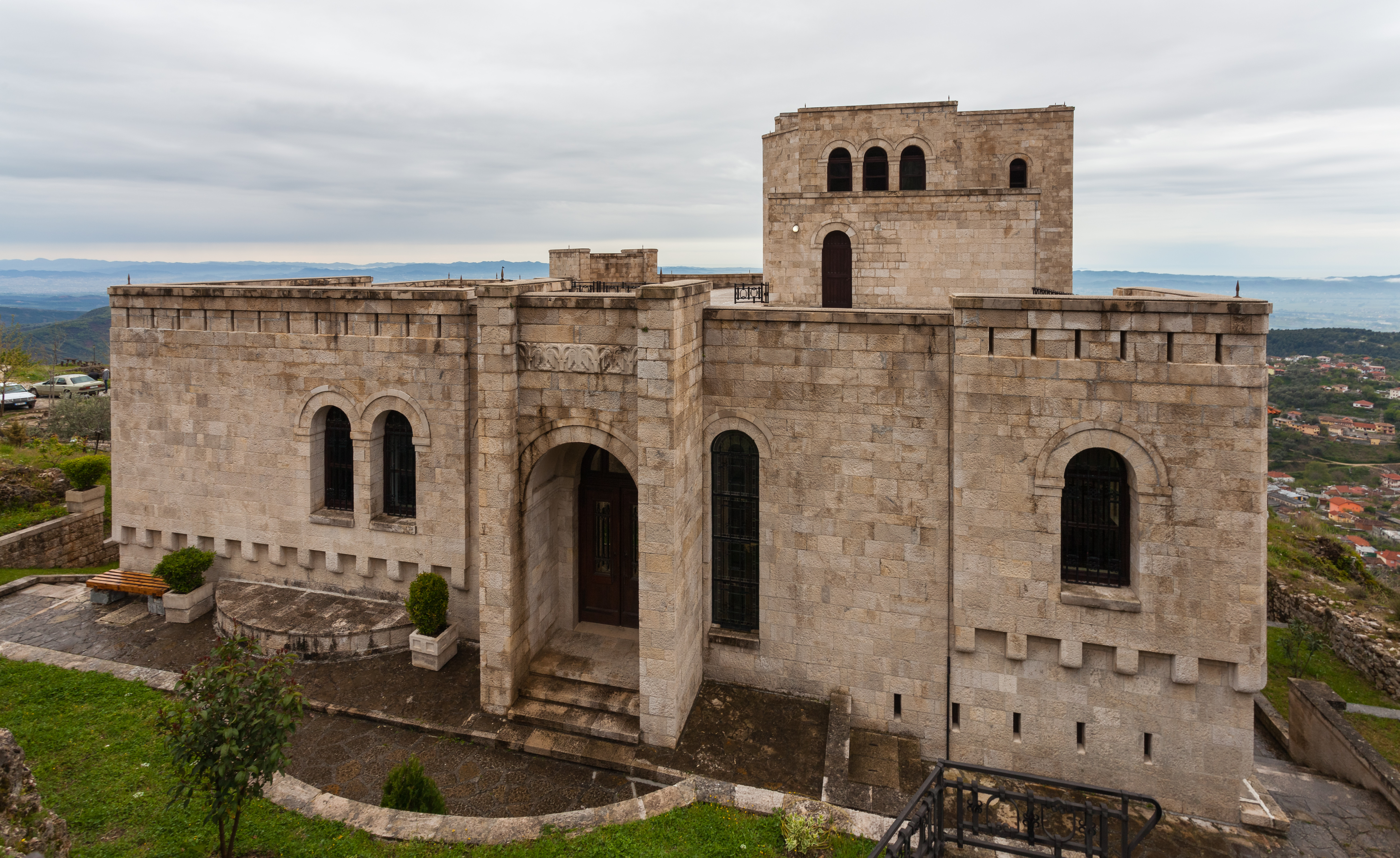
The rear entrance of the museum

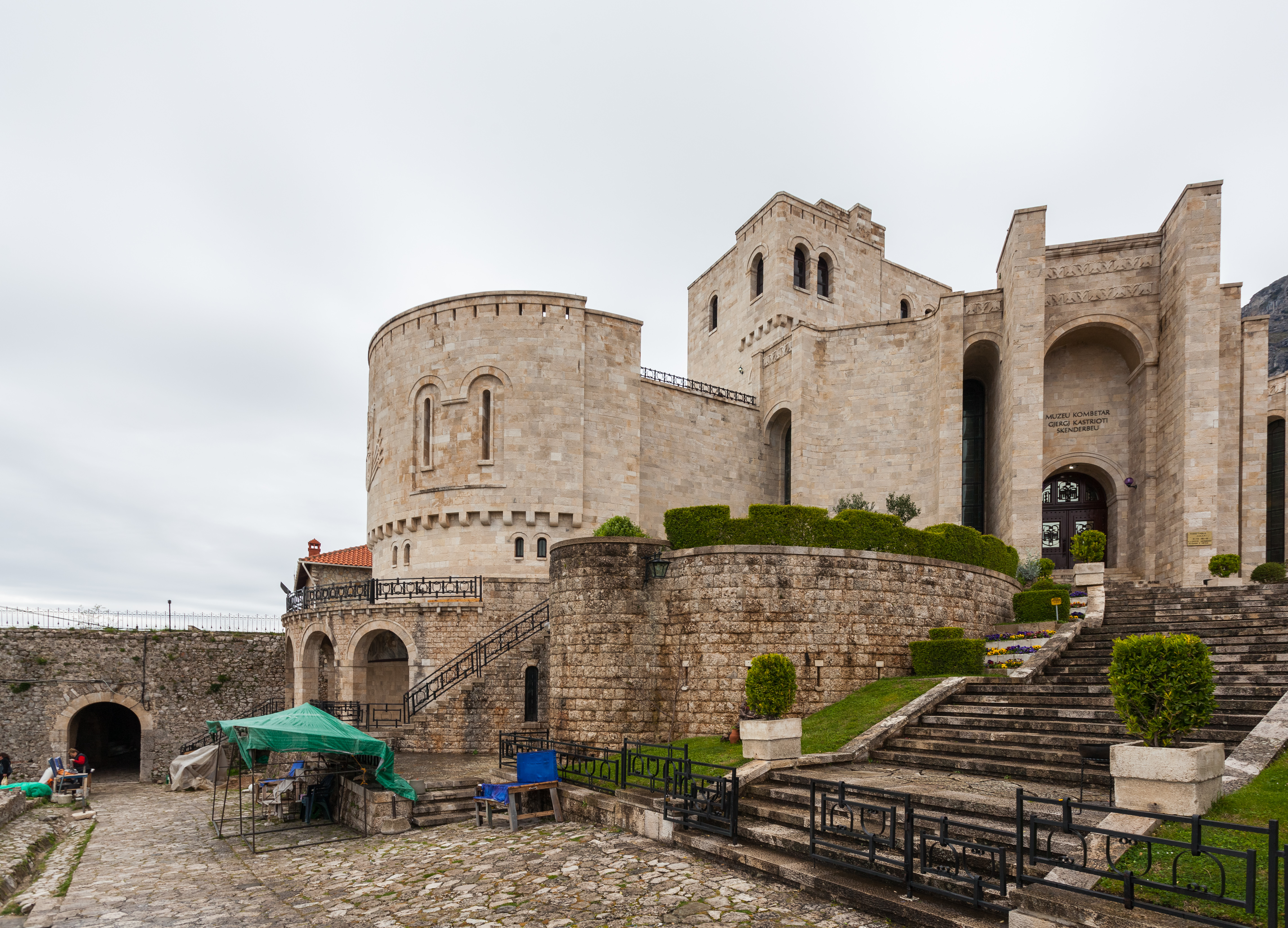
Museum exterior

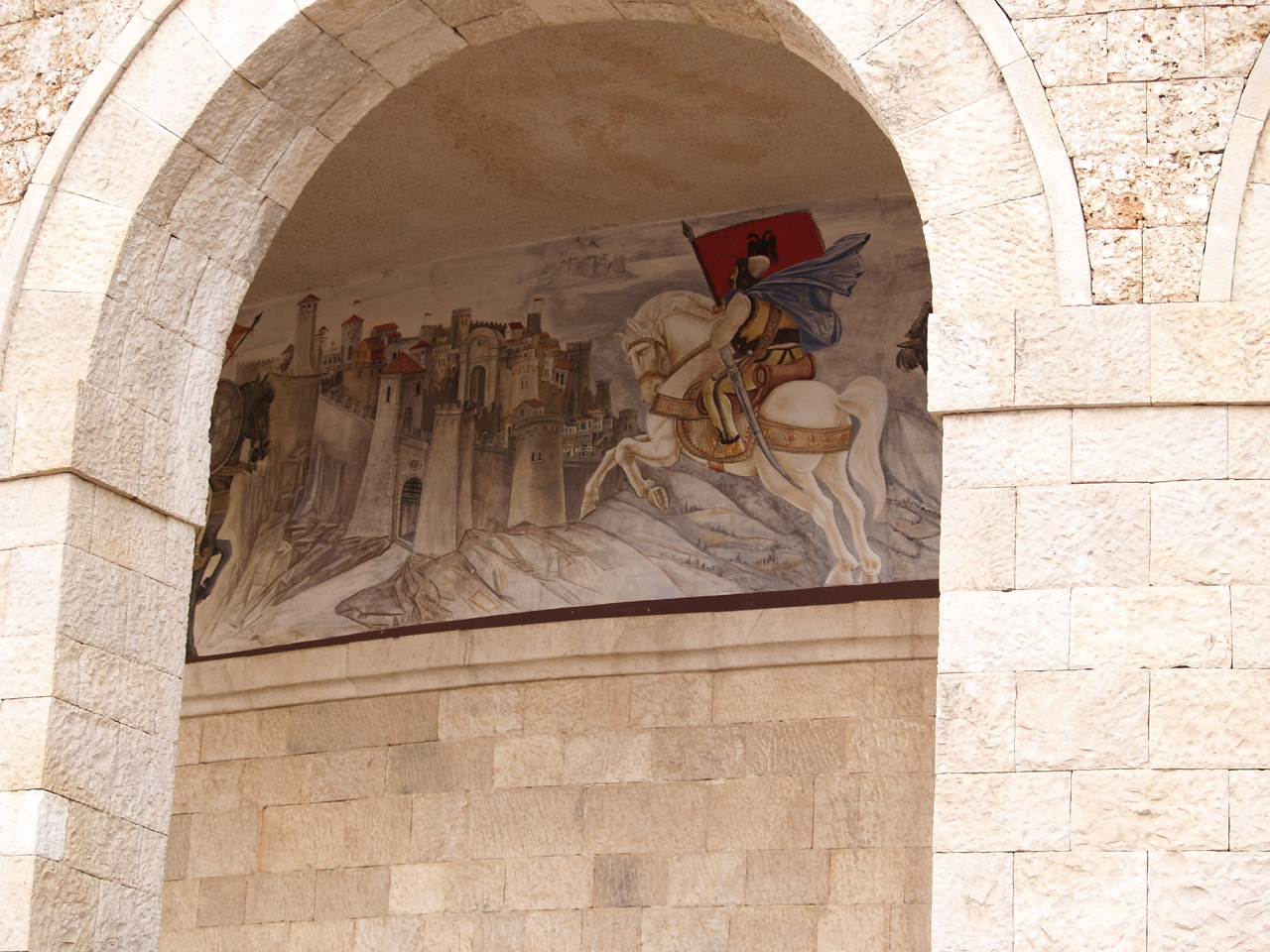
A mural

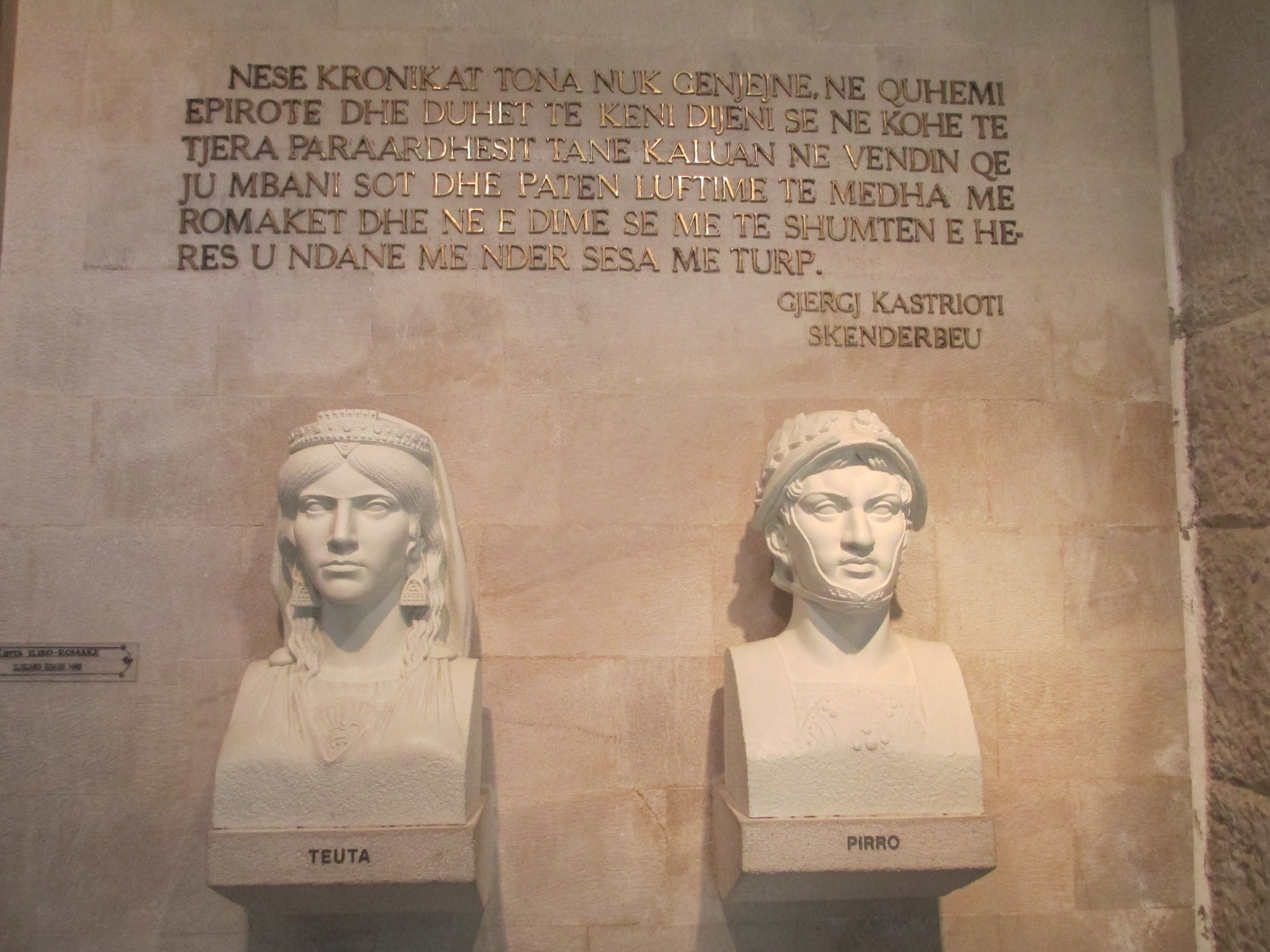
A quote of Skanderbeg

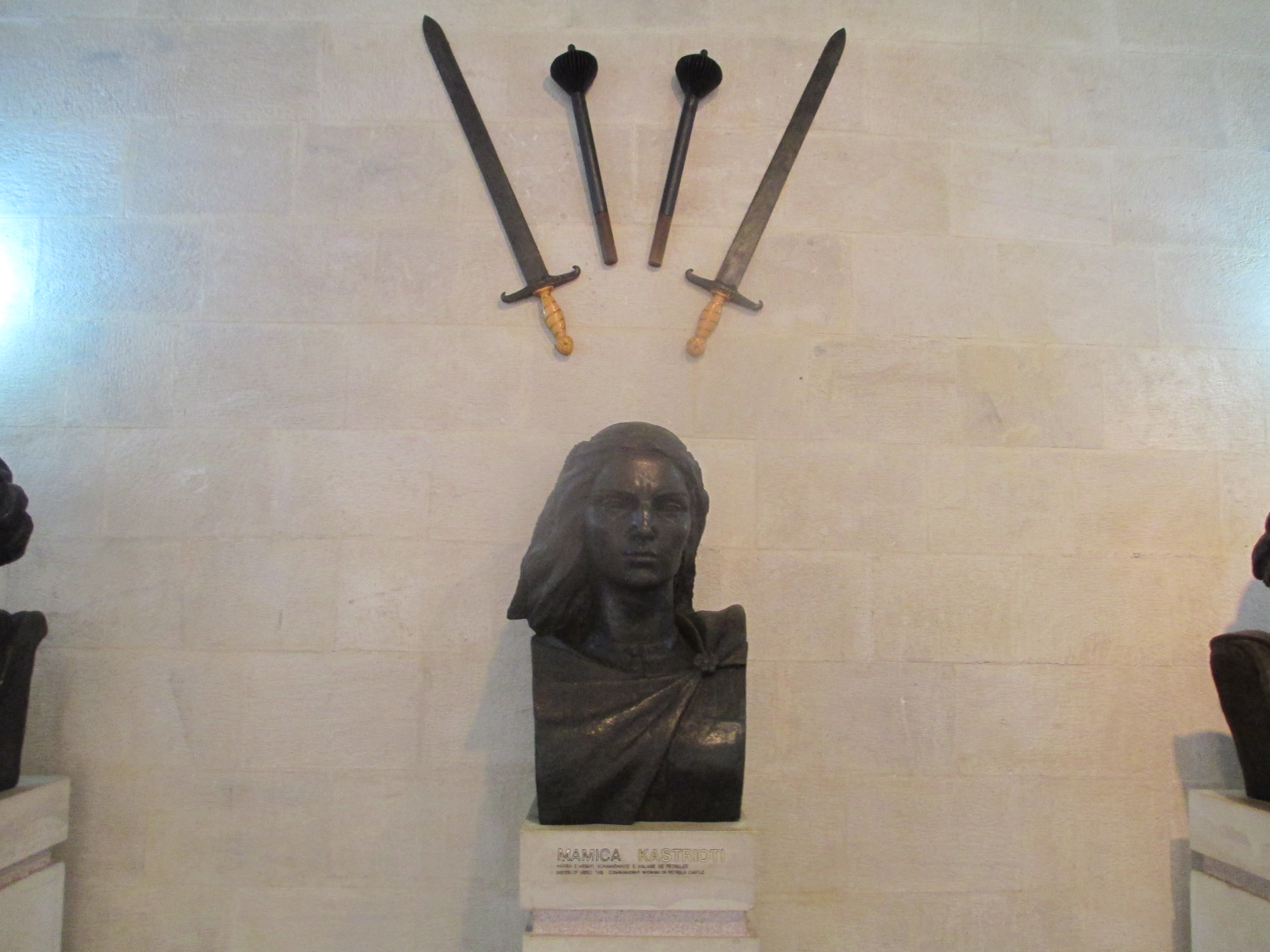
A sculpture of Mamica Kastrioti

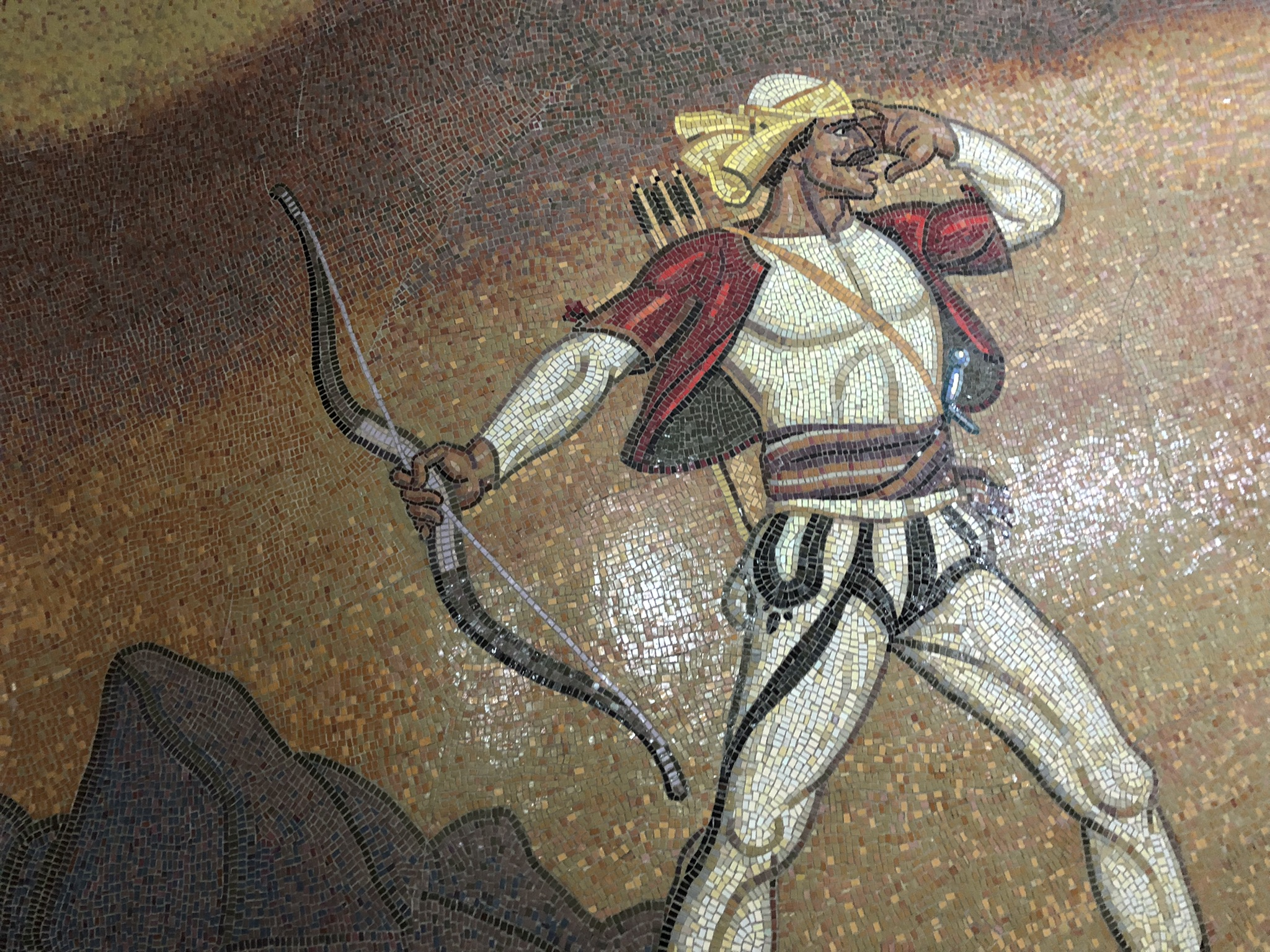
A mosaic

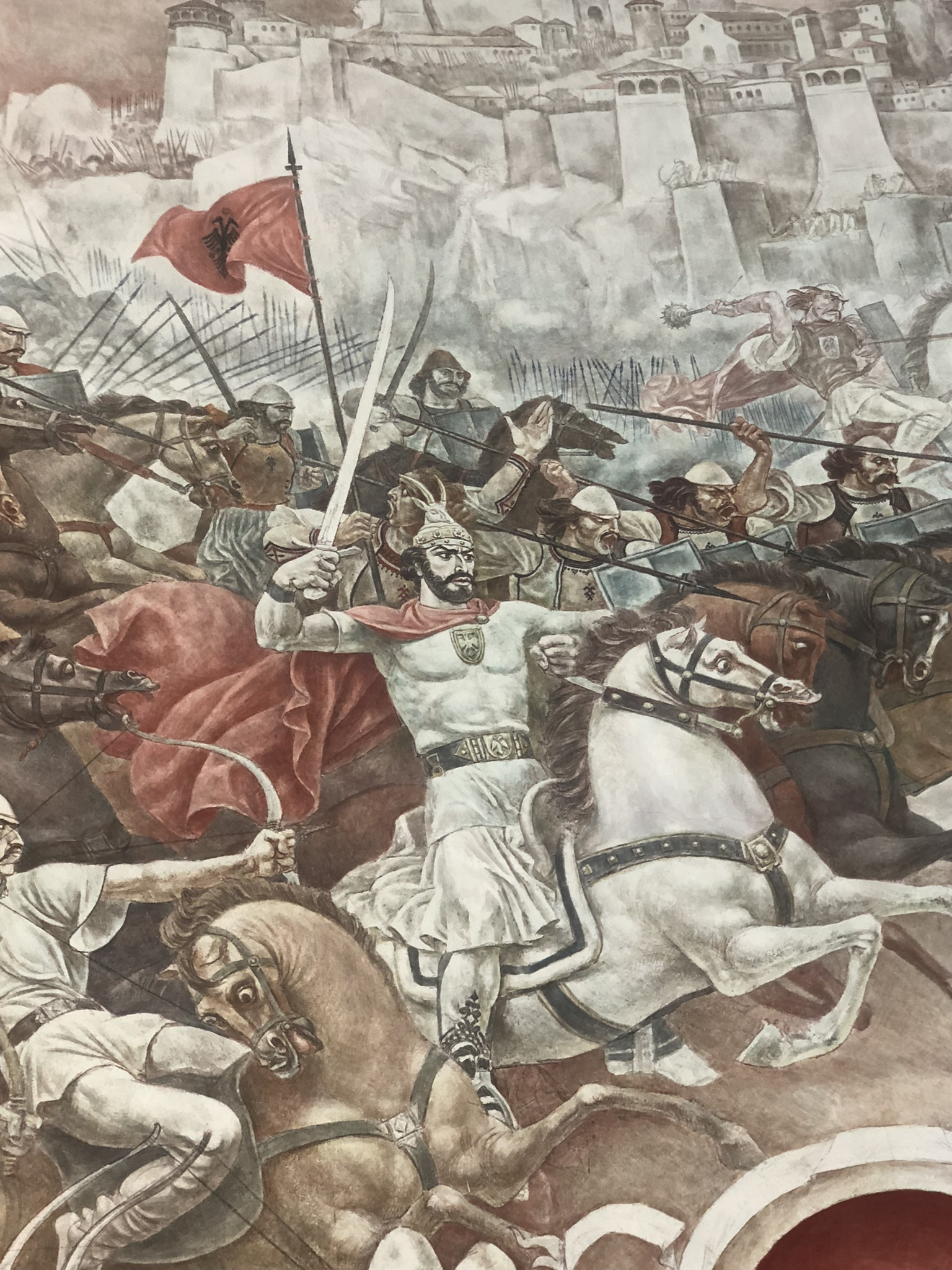
Part of a mural depicting Skanderbeg and his troops

== See also ==
- History of Albania
- Tourism in Albania
- Architecture of Albania
- List of museums in Albania
