= List of conflicts in Europe =

This is a list of conflicts in Europe ordered chronologically, including wars between European states, civil wars within European states, wars between a European state and a non-European state that took place within Europe, militarized interstate disputes, and global conflicts in which Europe was a theatre of war.

There are various definitions of Europe and in particular, there is a significant dispute about the eastern and southeastern boundaries, specifically about how to define the countries of the former Soviet Union. This list is based on a wide definition that includes much of the interface between Europe and Western Asia.

== Prehistory ==
- c. 5000 BCE Talheim Death Pit
- c. 5000 BCE Massacre of Schletz
- c. 5000 BCE Massacre at Kilianstädten
- c. 1300 BCE Tollense valley battlefield

== Bronze age ==
- c. 1200 BCE Trojan War
- c. 1200 BCE Late Bronze Age collapse
- 1121-c.800 BCE Urartian invasions of Diauehi
- c. 1104–900 BCE Dorian invasion

== 8th century BCE ==
- c. 753–351 BCE Roman–Etruscan Wars
- c. 753–494 BCE Roman–Sabine wars
- c.750-700 Scythian invasion of Colchis
- 743–724 BCE First Messenian War
- 710–650 BCE Lelantine War
- circa 700–601 BCE Alban war with Rome

== 7th century BCE ==
- 685–668 BCE Second Messenian War
- 669–668 BCE Sparta–Argos War
- 643-338 BCE Roman-Latin wars
- 600–265 BCE Greek–Punic Wars

== 6th century BCE ==
- 595–585 BCE First Sacred War
- 560 BCE Second Arcadian War
- 540 BCE Battle of Alalia
- 538–522 BCE Polycrates wars
- 513 BCE Scythian campaign of Darius I
- 509–396 BCE Early Italian campaigns

== 5th century BCE ==
- 500–499 BCE Persian invasion of Naxos
- 499–493 BCE Ionian Revolt
- 492–490 BCE First Persian invasion of Greece
- 482–479 BCE Second Persian invasion of Greece
- 480–307 BCE Sicilian Wars
- 460–445 BCE First Peloponnesian War
- 449–448 BCE Second Sacred War
- 440–439 BCE Samian War
- 431–404 BCE Second Peloponnesian War
- 404–403 BCE Phyle Campaign
- 401-400 BCE Elean War

== 4th century BCE ==
- 395–387 BCE Corinthian War
- 393-387 BCE Syracusan-Italiote war
- 390–387 BCE Celtic invasion of Italia
- 389-380 BCE Bosporan-Sindian War
- 389-360 BCE Bosporan-Heracleote War
- 378–371 BCE Boeotian War
- 378–362 BCE Theban-Spartan War
- 358-337 BCE Philip II's Illyrian Campaigns
- 337 BCE Macedonian-amphipolitan war
- 357–355 BCE Social War
- 356–346 BCE Third Sacred War
- 346-344 BCE Foreign War
- 339-338 BCE Fourth sacred war
- 339-338 BCE Second Olynthian war
- 335 BCE Alexander's Balkan campaign
- 331 BCE Lacedaemonian war
- 331 BCE Epirote invasion of southern italy
- 323–322 BCE Lamian War
- 321-319 BCE First War of the Diadochi
- 319-315 BCE Second War of the Diadochi
- 315-311 BCE Third War of the Diadochi
- 307-304 BCE Fourth War of the Diadochi

== 3rd century BCE ==
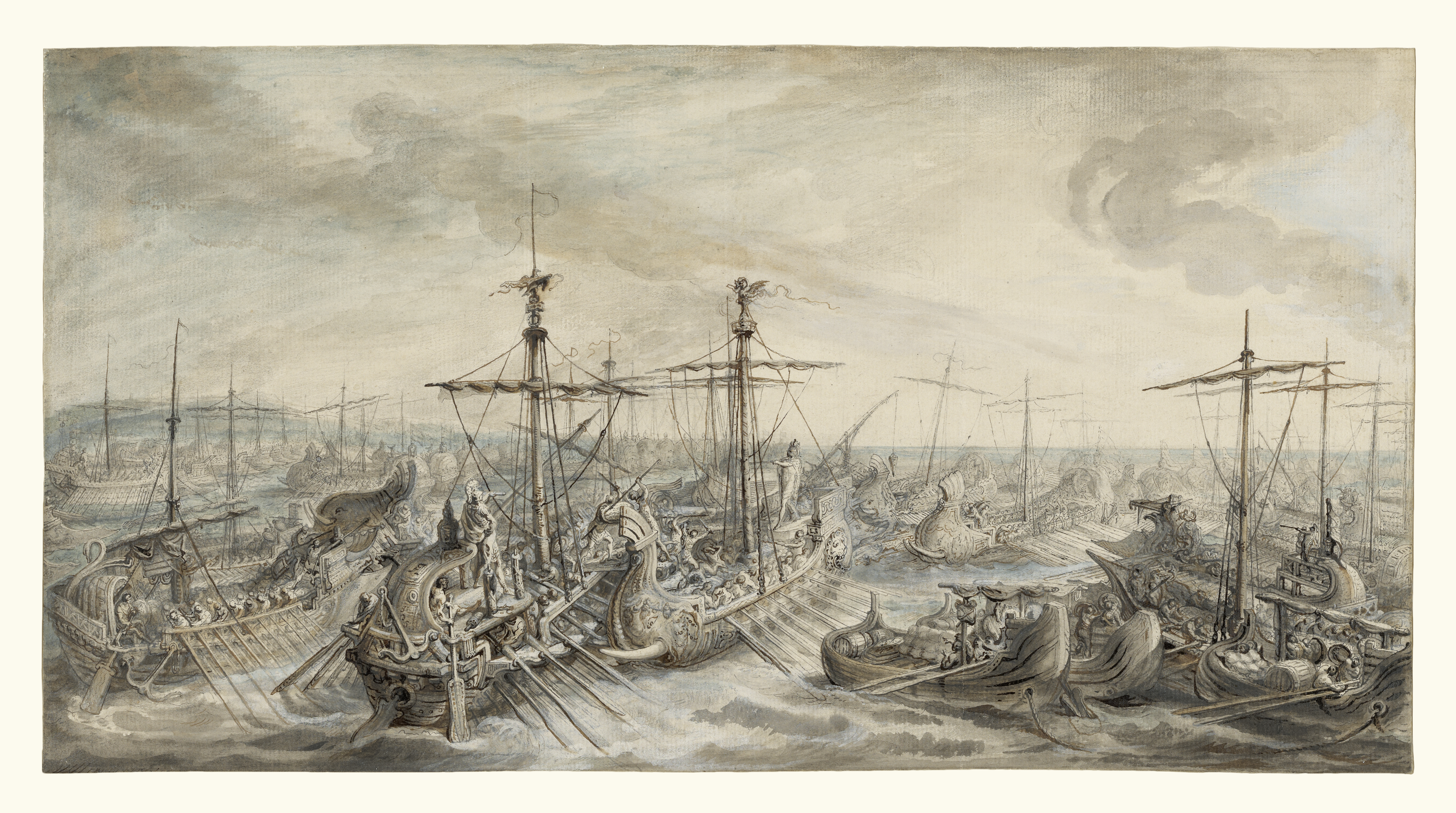
Battle of Cape Ecnomus, 256 BC

- 280-275 BCE Gallic invasion of Greece and Thrace
- 280–275 BCE Pyrrhic War
- 272 BCE Pyrrhus' invasion of the Peloponnese
- 267–261 BCE Chremonidean War
- 264–241 BCE First Punic War
- 229– 222 BCE Cleomenean War
- 229–228 BCE First Illyrian War
- 220–216 BCE Lyttian War
- 220–217 BCE Social War
- 220–219 BCE Second Illyrian War
- 218–201 BCE Second Punic War
- 214–205 BCE First Macedonian War

== 2nd century BCE ==
- 200–197 BCE Second Macedonian War
- 195 BCE Laconian War
- 191–189 BCE Aetolian War
- 171–168 BCE Third Macedonian War
- 146 BCE Achaean War
- 135–132 BCE First Servile War
- 113–101 BCE Cimbrian War
- 113 BCE – 476 CE Germanic Wars
- 104–100 BCE Second Servile War

== 1st century BCE ==
- 91–87 BCE Social War
- 87 BCE Bellum Octavianum
- 85 BCE Colchis uprising against Pontus
- 80–72 BCE Sertorian War
- 82–81 BCE Sulla's civil war
- 77 BCE Marcus Aemilius Lepidus
- 73–71 BCE Third Servile War
- 73–63 BCE Roman Expansion in Syria & Judea
- 65–63 BCE Pompey's campaign in Caucasus
- 63–62 BCE Second Catilinarian conspiracy
- 55–54 BCE Caesar's invasions of Britain
- 58–51 BCE Gallic Wars
- 49–45 BCE Caesar's Civil War
- 42–36 BCE Bellum Siculum
- 43 BCE Battle of Mutina
- 43–42 BCE Liberators' civil war
- 41–40 BCE Perusine War
- 32–30 BCE Final War of the Roman Republic
- 29–19 BCE Cantabrian Wars

== 1st century ==
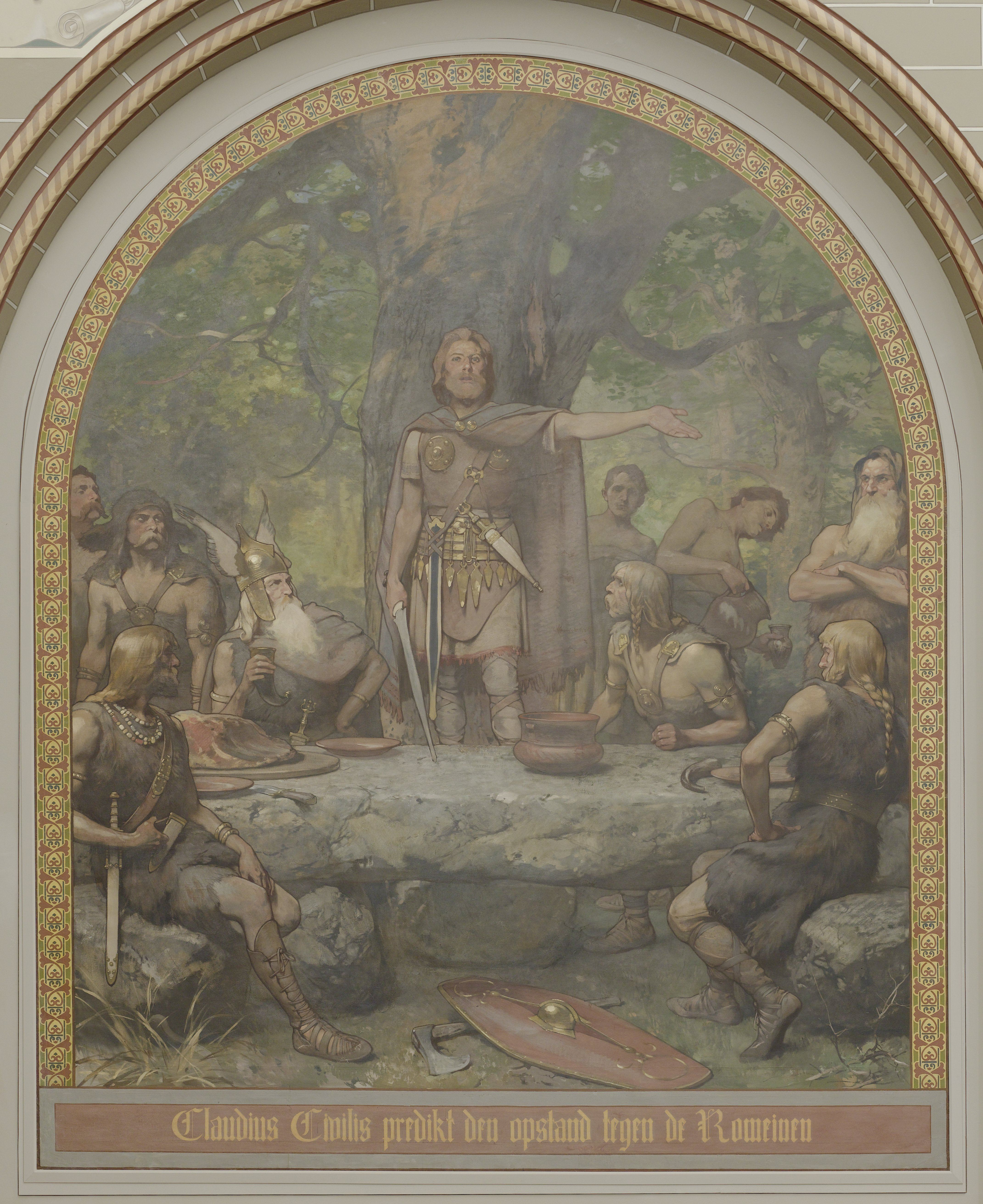
Revolt of the Batavi, 69

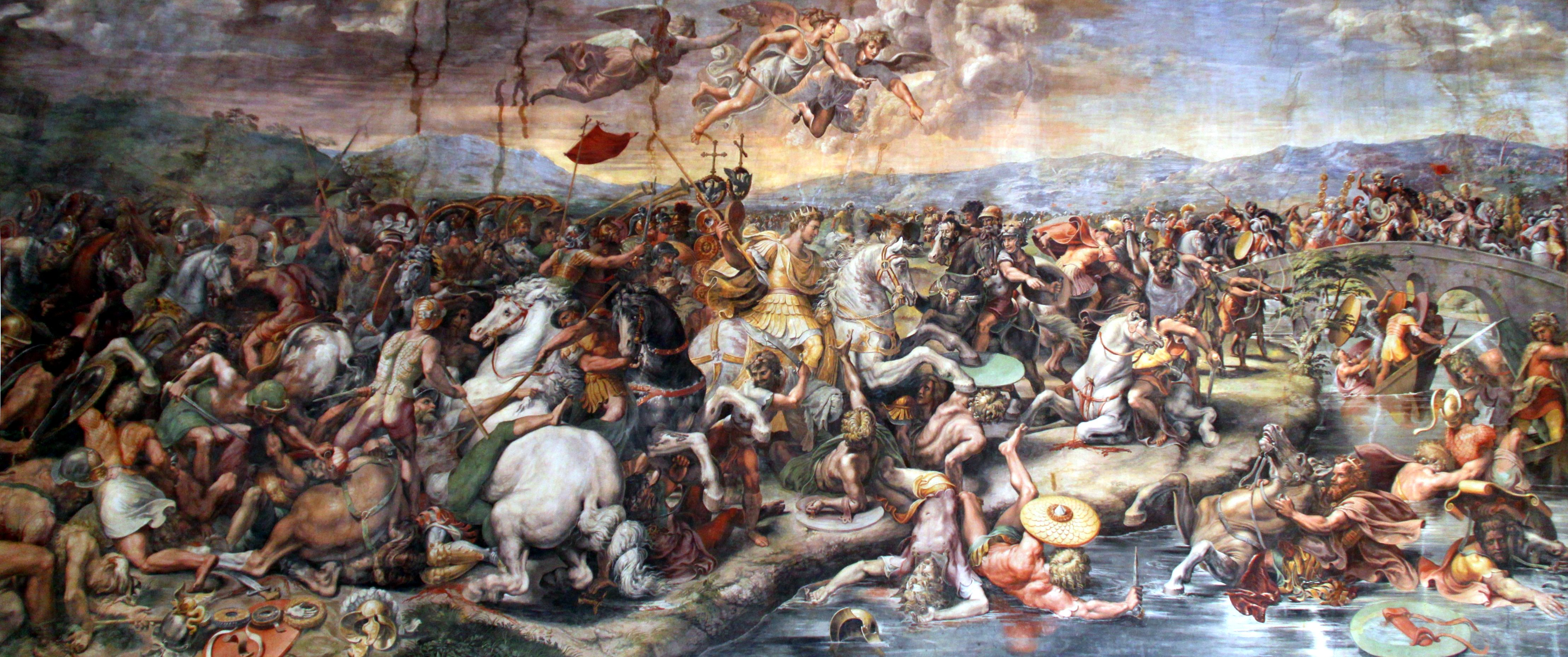
Battle of the Milvian Bridge, 312

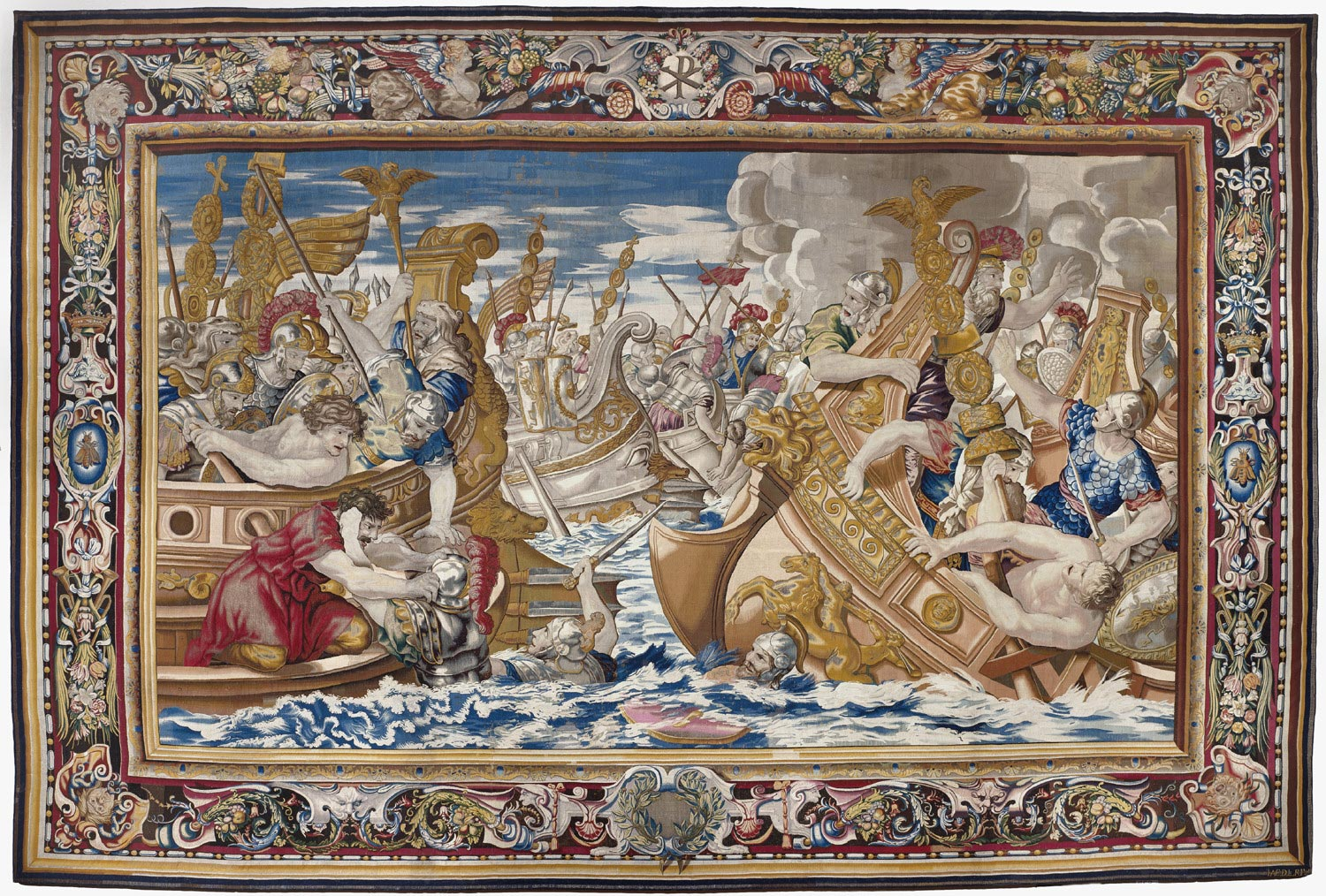
Battle of the Hellespont, 324

- 6–9 Bellum Batonianum
- 21 Revolt of Sacrovir
- 35 Iberian invasion of Armenia
- 49–96 Roman conquest of Britain
- 51 Armenian–Iberian war
- 60–61 Boudica's uprising
- 69 Year of the Four Emperors
- 69–70 Revolt of the Batavi
- 86–88 Domitian's Dacian War

== 2nd century ==
- 101–106 Trajan's Dacian Wars
- 166–180 Marcomannic Wars
- 193 Year of the Five Emperors

== 3rd century ==
- 208–210 Roman invasion of Caledonia
- 235–284 Crisis of the Third Century
- 238 Year of the Six Emperors
- 267–269 Gothic War (267–269)
- 274 Battle of Châlons
- 284–285 Roman civil war

== 4th century ==
- 306–324 Civil wars of the Tetrarchy
- 350–353 Roman civil war
- 356–378 Roman-Alamanni War
- 360–361 Roman civil war
- 367–368 Great Conspiracy
- 367–369 Gothic War (367–369)
- 376–382 Gothic War (376–382)
- 387–388 Roman civil war
- 394 Roman civil war (394)
- 395-398 Revolt of Alaric I
- 398 Stilicho's Pictish War

== 5th century ==
- 401–403 Gothic War (401–403)
- 405–406 War of Radagaisus
- 406 Vandal-Frankish war
- 406–413 Roman civil war (Constantine III)
  - 409–411 Gerontian Revolt
  - 411–413 Revolt of Jovinus
  - 412-413 War of Heraclianus
- 409–418 Gothic War (409–418)
- 409–417: Bagaudae Revolt, uprising in the Loire valley and Brittany
- 416–418 Gothic War in Spain (416-418)
- 420 Battle of the Nervasos Mountains
- 422 Battle of Tarraco
- 424–425 Roman civil war (Joannes vs Galla Placidia)
- 425–426: Gothic revolt of Theodoric I
- 428: Frankish War (428)
- 430: Gothic revolt of Anaolsus
- 430-431 Aetius campaign in the Alps
- 431-432: Frankish War (431–432)
- 432 Roman civil war of 432
- 435-436: Burgundian Revolt of Gunther - Flavius Aetius defects the Burgundians.
- 435–437: Bagaudae uprising under Tibatto in Gaul suppressed by Flavius Aetius.
- 436-439: Gothic War (436-439)
- 436–437 Hunnic-Burgundian War
- 439-443 Vandal War
- 441-453 Attila's invasion of the Roman Empire
- 455 Vandalic Sack of Rome
- 456 Gothic War in Spain (456)
- 457-458 Gothic War
- 461-468 Vandal War
- 461–476 Gothic War (461–476)
- 466 Vakhtang Gorgasali's campaign in North Caucasus
- 486 Battle of Soissons
- 492-508 Franco-Visigothic Wars

== 6th century ==
- 526–532 Iberian War
- 533-534 Vandalic War
- 535–554 Gothic War (535–554)
- 542–562 Lazic War
- 582–602 Maurice's Balkan campaigns

== 7th century ==
- c. 600–793 Frisian–Frankish wars
- 650–799 Arab–Khazar wars
- 680–1355 Byzantine–Bulgarian wars
  - 680 Battle of Ongal
- 695–717 Twenty Years' Anarchy

== 8th century ==
- 708 Byzantine–Bulgarian battle of Anchialus
- 711–718 Umayyad conquest of Hispania
- 715–718 Frankish Civil War (715–718)
- 717–718 Second Siege of Constantinople
- 722–1492 Reconquista
  - 719–759 Umayyad invasion of Gaul
- 735–737 Marwan ibn Muhammad's invasion of Georgia
- 759 Byzantine-Bulgarian battle of the Rishki Pass
- 772–804 Saxon Wars
- 792 Byzantine-Bulgarian battle of Marcellae
- 798 Sack of Lisbon

== 9th century ==
- c. 800/862–973 Hungarian invasions of Europe
- 809 Siege of Serdica (Sofia)
- 811 Byzantine-Bulgarian battle of Vărbitsa Pass (Battle of Pliska)
- 813 Byzantine-Bulgarian battle of Versinikia
- 830s Paphlagonian expedition of the Rus'
- 839–1330 Bulgarian–Serb Wars (medieval)
  - 839–842 Bulgarian–Serb War (839–842)
  - 853 Bulgarian–Serb War (853)
  - 917–924 Bulgarian–Serb wars of 917–924
- 854–1000 Croatian–Bulgarian wars
  - 854 Croatian–Bulgarian battle of 854
  - 926 Croatian–Bulgarian battle of 926
  - 998 Siege of Zadar
- 860 Rus'–Byzantine War (860)
- 865–878 Invasion of the Great Heathen Army
- 880–1380 Bulgarian–Hungarian wars
  - 896 Battle of Southern Buh
- 894–896 Byzantine–Bulgarian war of 894–896

== 10th century ==
- 902–911 Muslim conquest of Majorca
- 907 Rus'–Byzantine War (907)
- 913–927 Byzantine–Bulgarian war of 913–927
  - 917 Battle of Achelous
- 914 Arab-Georgian War
- 939 Battle of Andernach
- 941 Rus'–Byzantine War (941)
- 955 Battle of Recknitz
- 963–967 Polish–Veletian War
- 967/968–971 Sviatoslav's invasion of Bulgaria
- 980 Battle of Tara
- 982 Battle of Stilo
- 983 Great Slav Rising
- 986 Battle of the Gates of Trajan
- 986 Battle of Fyrisvellir

== 11th century ==
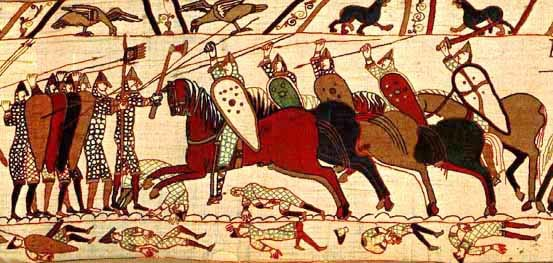
Battle of Hastings (1066)

- 1000 Battle of Svolder
- 1002–1018 German–Polish War
- 1012-1199 Georgian-Shaddadid wars
- 1014–1208 Byzantine–Georgian wars
- 1014 Battle of Clontarf
- 1014 Battle of Kleidion
- 1015–1016 Pisan–Genoese expeditions to Sardinia
- 1015–1016 Cnut's invasion of England
- 1018 Battle of Vlaardingen
- 1018 Byzantine conquest of Bulgaria
- 1024 Battle of Listven
- 1024 Rus'–Byzantine War
- c. 1037–1047 Miecław's Rebellion
- 1040-1041 Bulgarian Uprising of Peter Delyan
- 1043 Rus'–Byzantine War
- 1044 Battle of Ménfő
- 1046 Vata pagan uprising
- 1048–1064 Invasion of Denmark
- 1050–1185 Byzantine–Norman wars
- 1051-1052 German-Hungarian War
- 1057 Battle of Petroe
- 1060 Battle of the Theben Pass
- 1063 German invasion of Hungary
- 1065–1067 War of the Three Sanchos
- 1066 Norwegian invasion of England
- 1066–1088 Norman conquest of England
- 1067–1194 Norman invasion of Wales
- 1067 Battle on the Nemiga River
- 1068 Pecheneg invasion of Hungary
- 1068 Battle of the Alta River
- 1072 Bulgarian Uprising of Georgi Voyteh
- 1073–1075 Saxon Rebellion
- 1074 Battle of Kemej
- 1074 Battle of Mogyoród
- 1075 Revolt of the Earls
- 1077–1088 Great Saxon Revolt
- 1078 Battle of Kalavrye
- 1088 Rebellion of 1088
- 1091 Hungarian occupation of Croatia
- 1093 Battle of Schmilau
- 1093 Battle of the Stugna River
- 1094 Battle of Cuarte
- 1097 Battle of Gvozd Mountain
- 1099–1204 Georgian–Seljuk wars

== 12th century ==
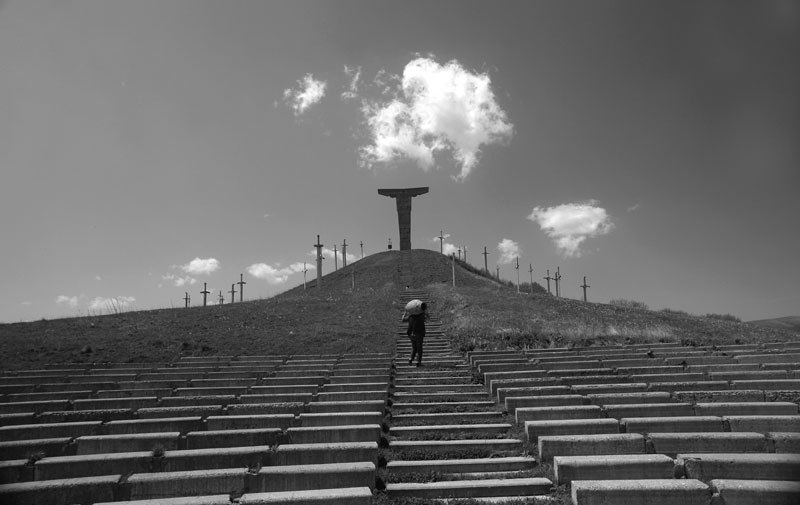
The didgori monument, commemorating the battle of didgori, Georgia, 1121 AD.

- 1109 Battle of Głogów
- 1115 Battle of Welfesholz
- 1119 Battle of Bremule
- 1121 Battle of Didgori
- 1126 Battle of Chlumec
- 1125–1186 Guelphs and Ghibellines
- 1127–1129 Byzantine-Hungarian War
- 1130–1137 Luso–Leonese War
- 1130–1240 Civil war era in Norway
- 1135–1153 The Anarchy
- 1142–1445 Swedish–Novgorodian Wars
- 1144–1162 Baussenque Wars
- 1146 Battle of the Fischa
- 1159–1345 Wars of the Guelphs and Ghibellines
- 1162–1165 Luso–Leonese War
- 1164 Battle of Verchen
- 1167 Battle of Sirmium
- 1167–1169 Luso–Leonese War
- 1169–1175 Norman invasion of Ireland
- 1173–1174 Revolt of 1173–74
- 1185–1204 Uprising of Asen and Peter
- 1196–1197 Castilian–Leonese War
- 1198 Battle of Gisors
- 1198–1290 Livonian Crusade
- 1198–1215 German throne dispute

== 13th century ==
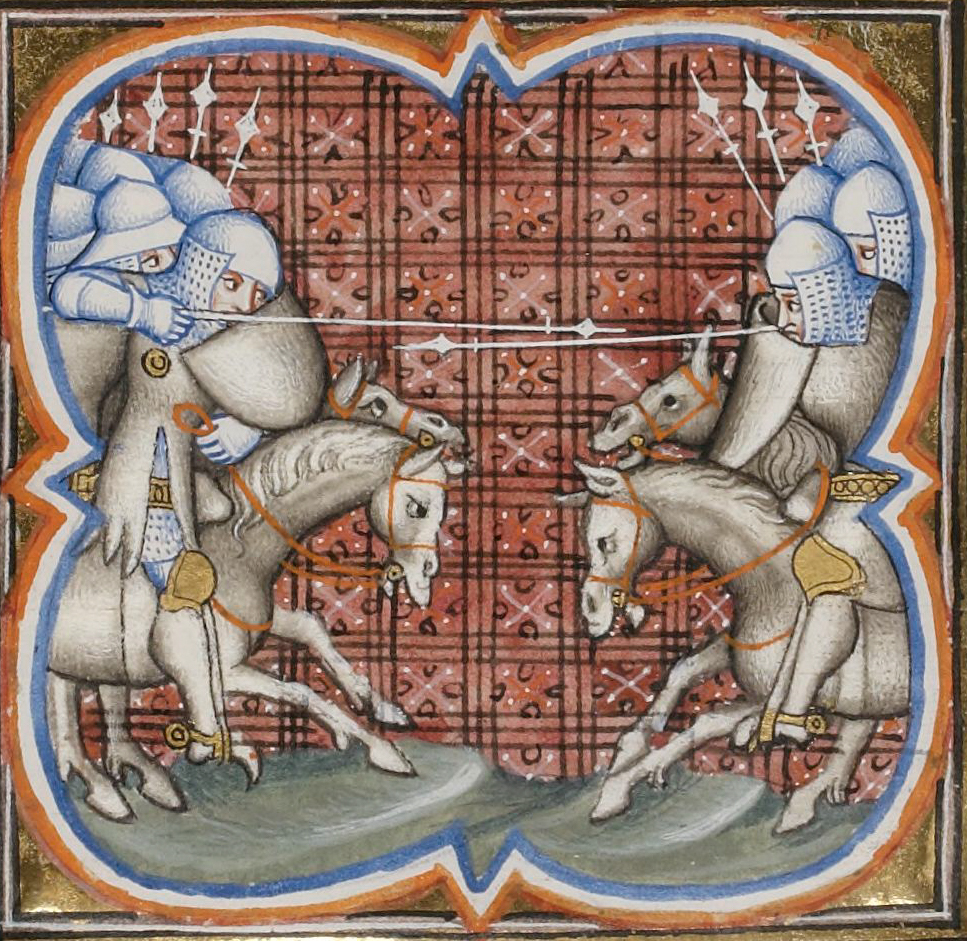
Battle of Muret, 1213

- 1201 Battle of Stellau
- 1202 Siege of Zadar
- 1202–1214 Anglo-French War
- 1204–1261 Nicaean–Latin wars
- 1205 Battle of Serres (1205)
- 1205 Battle of Zawichost
- 1205 Battle of Adrianople (1205)
- 1206 Battle of Rodosto
- 1206 Battle of Rusion
- 1207 Battle of Messinopolis
- 1208 Battle of Beroia (1208)
- 1208 Battle of Philippopolis (1208)
- 1208–1227 Conquest of Estonia
- 1209–1229 Albigensian Crusade
- 1211 Welsh uprising of 1211
- 1215–1217 First Barons' War
- 1216–1392 Guelphs and Ghibellines
- 1216–1222 War of Succession of Champagne
- 1220–1264 Age of the Sturlungs
- 1223–1241 Mongol invasion of Europe
- 1224 Siege of La Rochelle
- 1227 Battle of Bornhöved
- 1228–1230 War of the Keys
- 1230 Battle of Klokotnitsa
- 1231–1233 Friso-Drentic War
- 1234–1238 Georgian-Mongol War
- 1235 Siege of Constantinople (1235)
- 1236–1238 First war against Swantopolk II
- 1239–1245 Teltow War
- 1241–1242 First Mongol invasion of Hungary
- 1242–1243 Mongol invasion of Bulgaria and Serbia
- 1242 Saintonge War
- 1242–1249 Prussian uprisings
- 1246–1282 War of the Babenberg Succession
- 1256–1258 War of the Euboeote Succession
- 1256–1381 Venetian–Genoese Wars
- 1256–1422 Friso-Hollandic Wars
- 1257–1259 Rebellion of Arbanon
- 1260 Battle of Kressenbrunn
- 1260–1274 Prussian uprisings
- 1262–1266 Scottish–Norwegian War
- 1264–1267 Second Barons' War
- 1264–1265 Hungarian Civil War
- 1269–1272 Civil war in Pomerelia
- 1274–1281 Byzantine-Angevin war
- 1275–1276 The war against Valdemar Birgersson
- 1276–1278 6000-mark war
- 1276 War of Navarra
- 1277–1280 Uprising of Ivaylo
- 1277-1283 Conquest of Wales by Edward I
- 1278 Battle on the Marchfeld
- 1282 Cumanic uprising in Hungary
- 1282–1302 War of the Sicilian Vespers
- 1283–1289 War of the Limburg Succession
- 1284–1285 Aragonese Crusade
- 1285–1286 Second Mongol invasion of Hungary
- 1288–1295 War of the Outlaws
- 1296–1357 Wars of Scottish Independence
- 1297–1305 Franco-Flemish War
- 1298 Battle of Göllheim

== 14th century ==
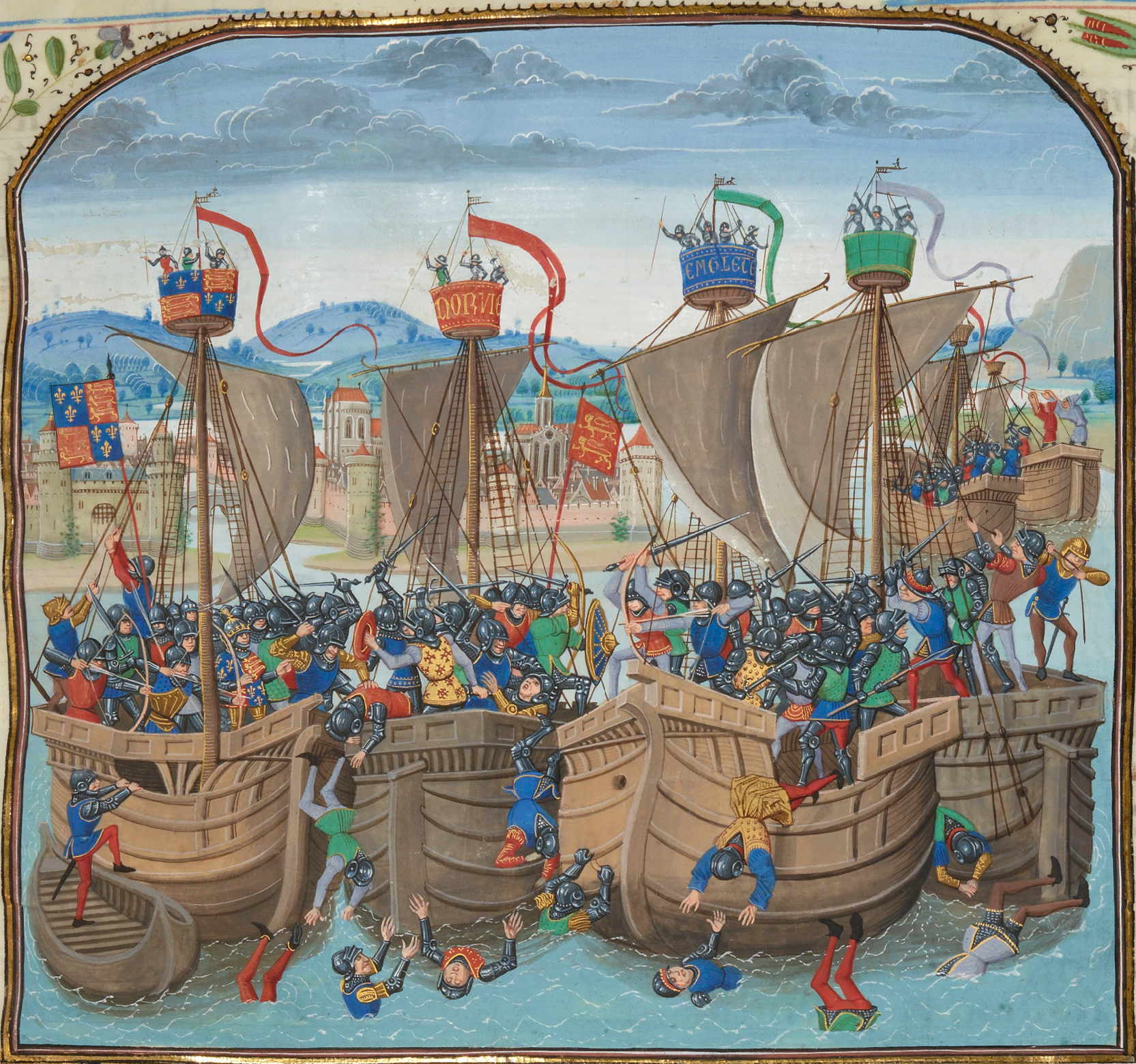
Battle of Sluys, 1340, from a manuscript

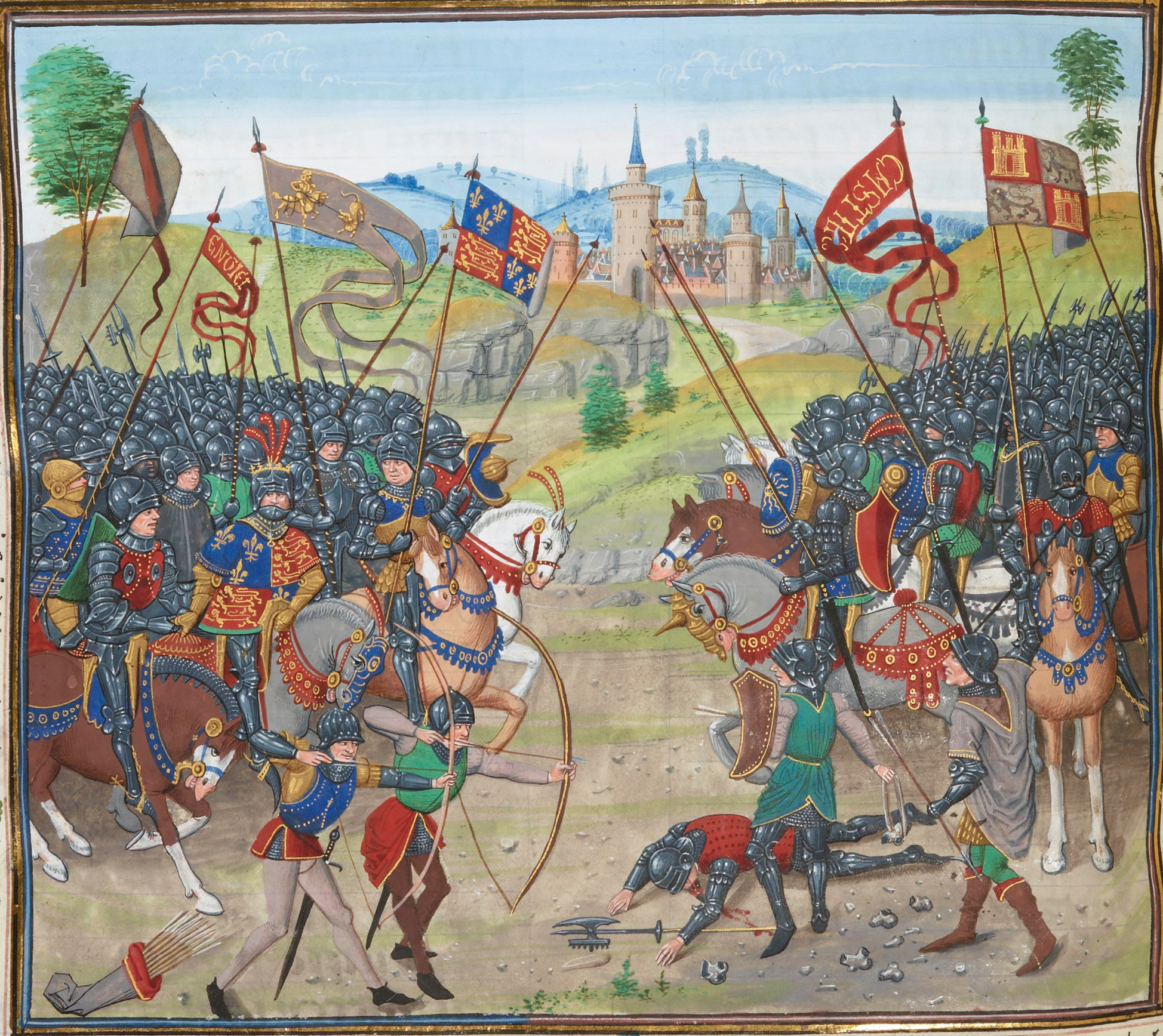
Battle of Nájera, 1367

- 1301–1308 Hungarian Interregnum
- 1302 Battle of the Golden Spurs
- 1304 Battle of Skafida
- 1304–1310 The Swedish brother's feud
- 1307 Battle of Lucka
- 1310 – 1313 Henry VII's Italian campaign
- 1311 Battle of Halmyros
- 1311–1312 Rebellion of mayor Albert
- 1312 Battle of Rozgony
- 1313 Battle of Gammelsdorf
- 1321–1322 Despenser War
- 1321–1328 Byzantine civil war of 1321–28
- 1322 Battle of Bliska
- 1322 Battle of Mühldorf
- 1323–1328 Peasant revolt in Flanders
- 1324 War of Saint-Sardos
- 1326–1332 Polish–Teutonic War
- 1330–1336 Hungarian-Wallachian War
- 1330 Catalan–Genoese War
- 1332 Battle of Rusokastro
- 1333–1338 Burke Civil War
- 1337–1453 Hundred Years' War
- 1340–1392 Galicia–Volhynia Wars
- 1341–1347 Byzantine civil war of 1341–47
- 1342–1350 Zealot's Rebellion
- 1343–1345 St. George's Night Uprising
- 1345–1396 Bulgarian–Ottoman wars
  - 1345 Battle of Peritheorion
  - 1355 Battle of Ihtiman
  - 1382/1385 Siege of Sofia
  - 1396 Battle of Nicopolis
- 1347–1352 Neapolitan campaigns of Louis the Great
- 1350–1370 Muzaka-Serbian Conflict
- 1350–1498 Wars of the Vetkopers and Schieringers
- 1350–1490 Hook and Cod wars
- 1356–1358 Jacquerie
- 1356–1375 War of the Two Peters
- 1358–1383 Albanian-Anjou Conflict
- 1358/1359 Battle of Achelous (1359)
- 1362 Battle of Helsingborg
- 1362–1457 War of the Bands
- 1363-1364 Thopian-Zetan War (1363–64)
- 1366–1367 Savoyard crusade
- 1366–1369 Castilian Civil War
- 1366–1526 Hungarian-Ottoman Wars
- 1366–1367 Savoyard crusade
- 1367–1370 Albanian-Epirote War (1367–70)
- 1369–1370 First Fernandine War
- 1371–1413 Serbian–Ottoman wars
  - 1371 Battle of Maritsa
  - 1385/1387 Battle of Pločnik
- 1371 Battle of Baesweiler
- 1371–1379 War of the Guelderian Succession
- 1371–1381 War of Chioggia
- 1372–1373 Second Fernandine War
- 1373–1377 Władysław the White's Rebellion
- 1373–1379 Byzantine civil war of 1373–79
- 1374–1375 Albanian-Epirote War (1374–1375)
- 1375 Gugler War
- 1375–1378 War of the Eight Saints
- 1376 Durrës Expedition
- 1378 Knights Hospitaller invasion of Despotate of Arta
- 1381 Peasants' Revolt
- 1381–1382 Third Fernandine War
- 1381–1384 Lithuanian Civil War (1381–84)
- 1381–1384 Albanian-Epirote War (1381–84)
- 1382 Harelle and Maillotins Revolt
- 1381–1404 Second Georgian–Mongol War
- 1383–1385 Invasion of Portugal by Castille – Battle of Aljubarrota, 14 August 1385
- 1385 Battle of Savra
- 1387 Battle of Margate
- 1389 Battle of Kosovo
- 1389-90 Albanian-Epirote War of 1389–90
- 1389–1392 Lithuanian Civil War (1389–92)
- 1390–1402 Florentine–Milanese Wars
- 1395 Battle of Rovine
- 1396 Battle of Nicopolis

== 15th century ==
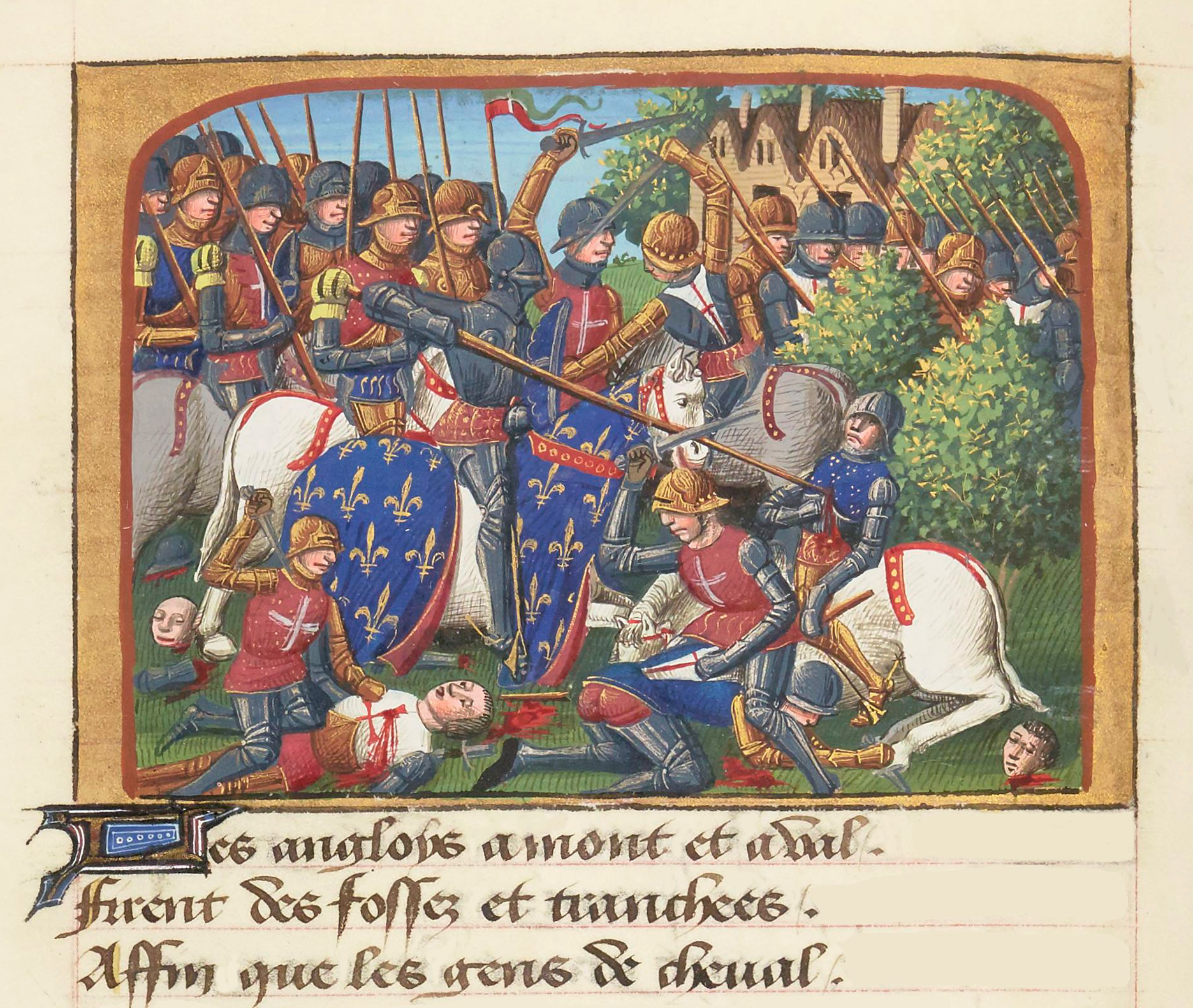
Battle of Formigny, 1450

- 1400–1415 Glyndŵr Rising
- 1401–1429 Appenzell Wars
- 1407–1468 Georgian-Turkoman War
- 1409–1411 Polish–Lithuanian–Teutonic War
- 1410–1435 War of Slesvig
- 1414 Hunger War
- 1419–1434 Hussite Wars
- 1422 Gollub War
- 1422 Battle of Arbedo
- 1424 Aragonese expedition to Tunisia
- 1425–1454 Wars in Lombardy
- 1431–1435 Polish–Teutonic War
- 1432 Aragonese expedition to Tunisia
- 1434–1436 Engelbrekt rebellion
- 1435–1442 Aragonese conquest of Naples
- 1437 Budai Nagy Antal revolt
- 1438–1556 Russo-Kazan Wars
- 1440–1446 Old Zürich War
- 1441 Battle of Samobor
- 1443–1444 Long campaign
- 1444 Battle of Varna
- 1445 First Battle of Olmedo
- 1447–1448 Albanian–Venetian War
- 1449–1450 First Margrave War
- 1449 Battle of Castione
- 1449–1453 Revolt of Ghent
- 1450 Jack Cade's Rebellion
- 1451–1455 Navarrese Civil War
- 1453 Fall of Constantinople
- 1453–1454 Morea revolt
- 1454–1466 Thirteen Years' War
- 1455–1485 Wars of the Roses
- 1462 Night attack at Târgoviște
- 1462–1485 Rebellion of the Remences
- 1462–1472 Catalan Civil War
- 1463–1479 Venetian-Ottoman War
- 1463-1490 Georgian Civil War (1463–1490)
- 1465 Battle of Montlhéry
- 1465–1468 Wars of Liège
- 1466–1469 Irmandiño Wars
- 1467 Second Battle of Olmedo
- 1467 Hungarian - Moldavian war
- 1467–1479 War of the Priests
- 1468 Waldshut War
- 1468–1478 Bohemian War
- 1470–1471 Dano-Swedish War
- 1470–1474 Anglo-Hanseatic War
- 1474–1477 Burgundian Wars
- 1475 Battle of Vaslui
- 1475–1479 War of the Castilian Succession
- 1476 Battle of Valea Alba
- 1477–1488 Austrian–Hungarian War (1477–88)
- 1478 Carinthian Peasant Revolt
- 1478 Battle of Giornico
- 1479 Battle of Guinegate
- 1482–1484 War of Ferrara
- 1484 Battle of Lochmaben Fair
- 1485–1488 Mad War
- 1487 Battle of Crevola
- 1487 War of Rovereto
- 1488 Battle of Sauchieburn
- 1490-91 War of the Hungarian Succession
- 1492–1583 Muscovite–Lithuanian Wars
- 1493 Battle of Krbava Field
- 1493–1593 Hundred Years' Croatian–Ottoman War
- 1494–1498 Italian War of 1494–98
- 1495–1497 Russo-Swedish War
- 1497 Cornish Rebellion of 1497
- 1497 Battle of Rotebro
- 1499 Swabian War
- 1499–1504 Italian War of 1499–1504 – 20,000 killed in action

== 16th century ==
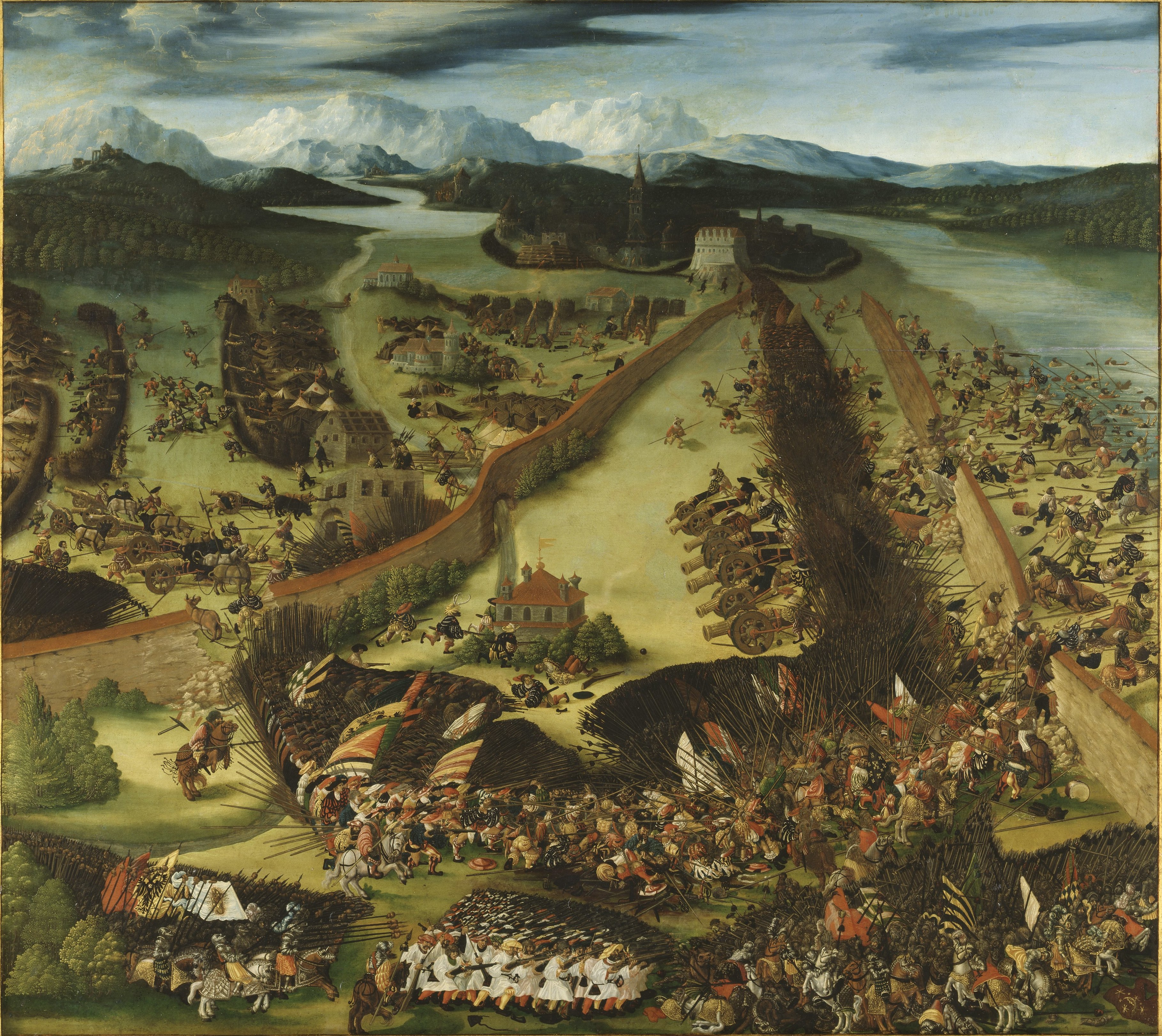
Battle of Pavia, 1525

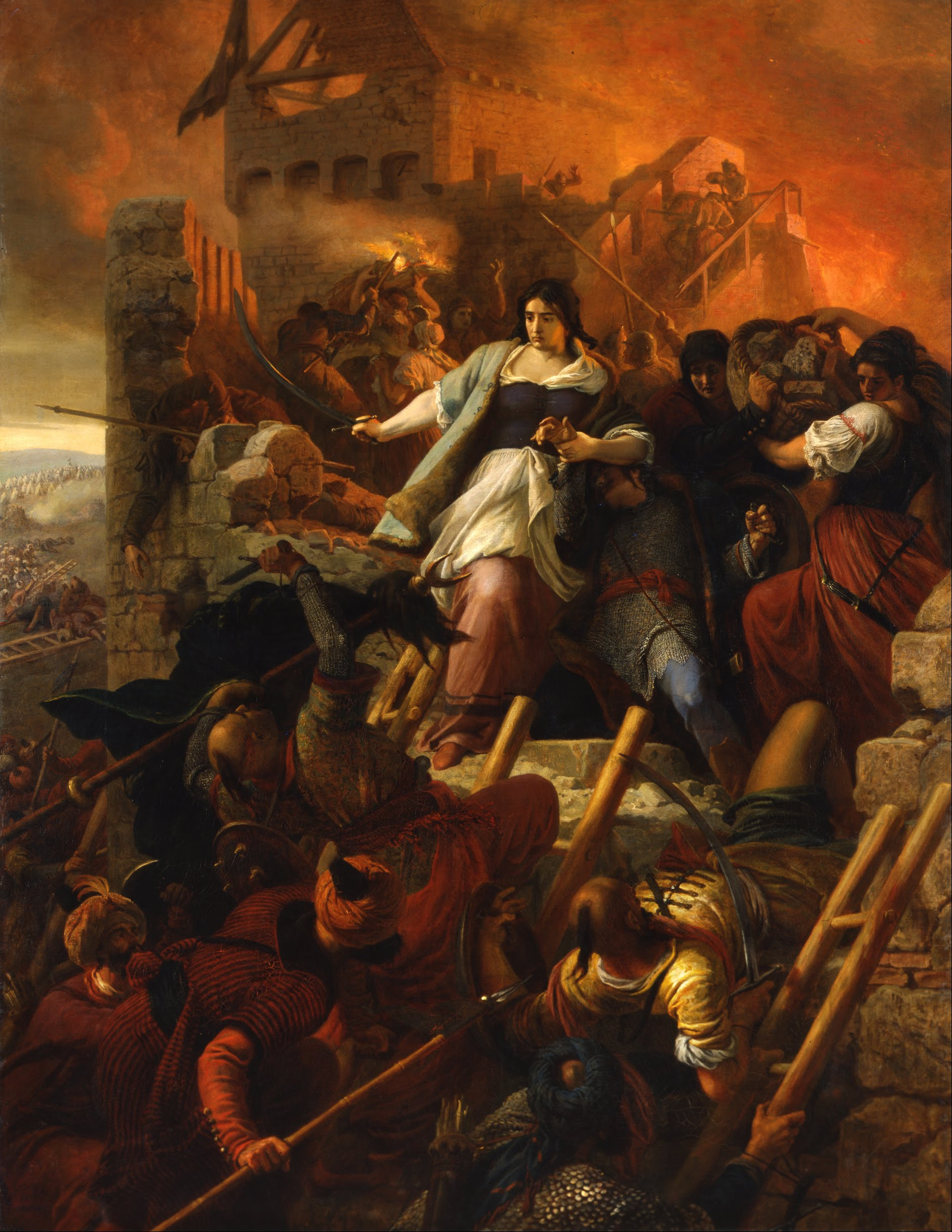
Siege of Eger, 1552

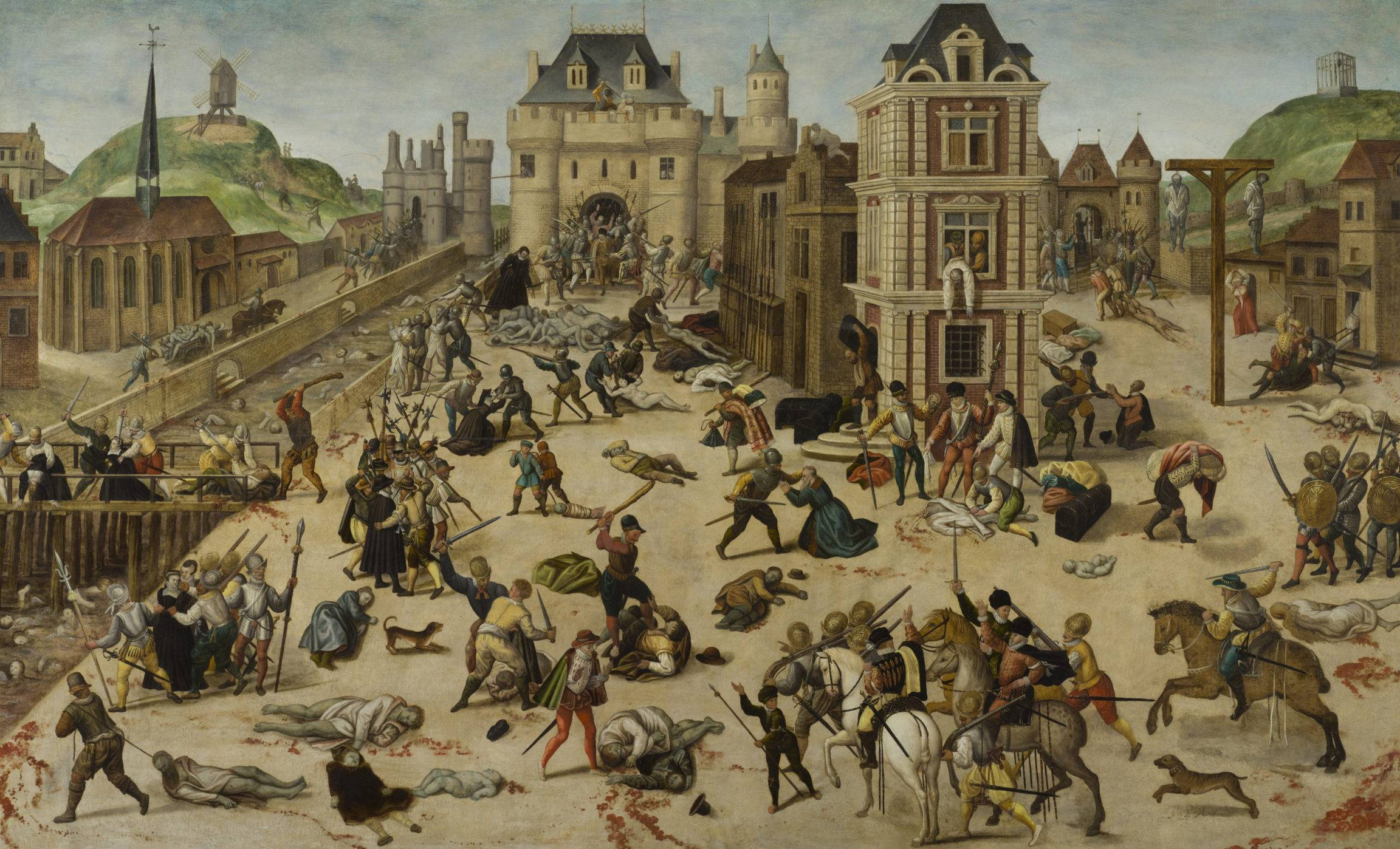
St. Bartholomew's Day massacre, 1572

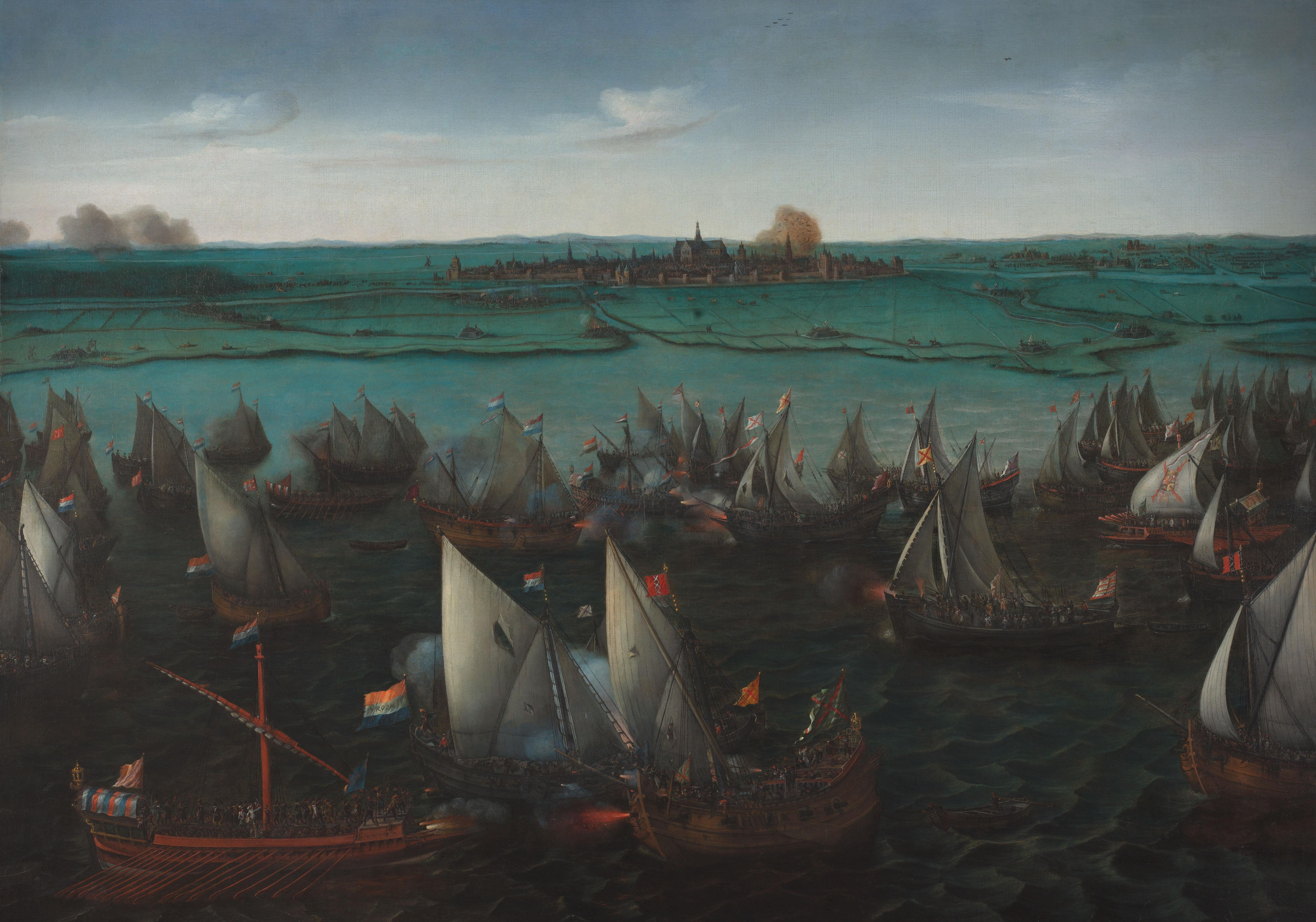
Battle of Haarlemmermeer, 1573

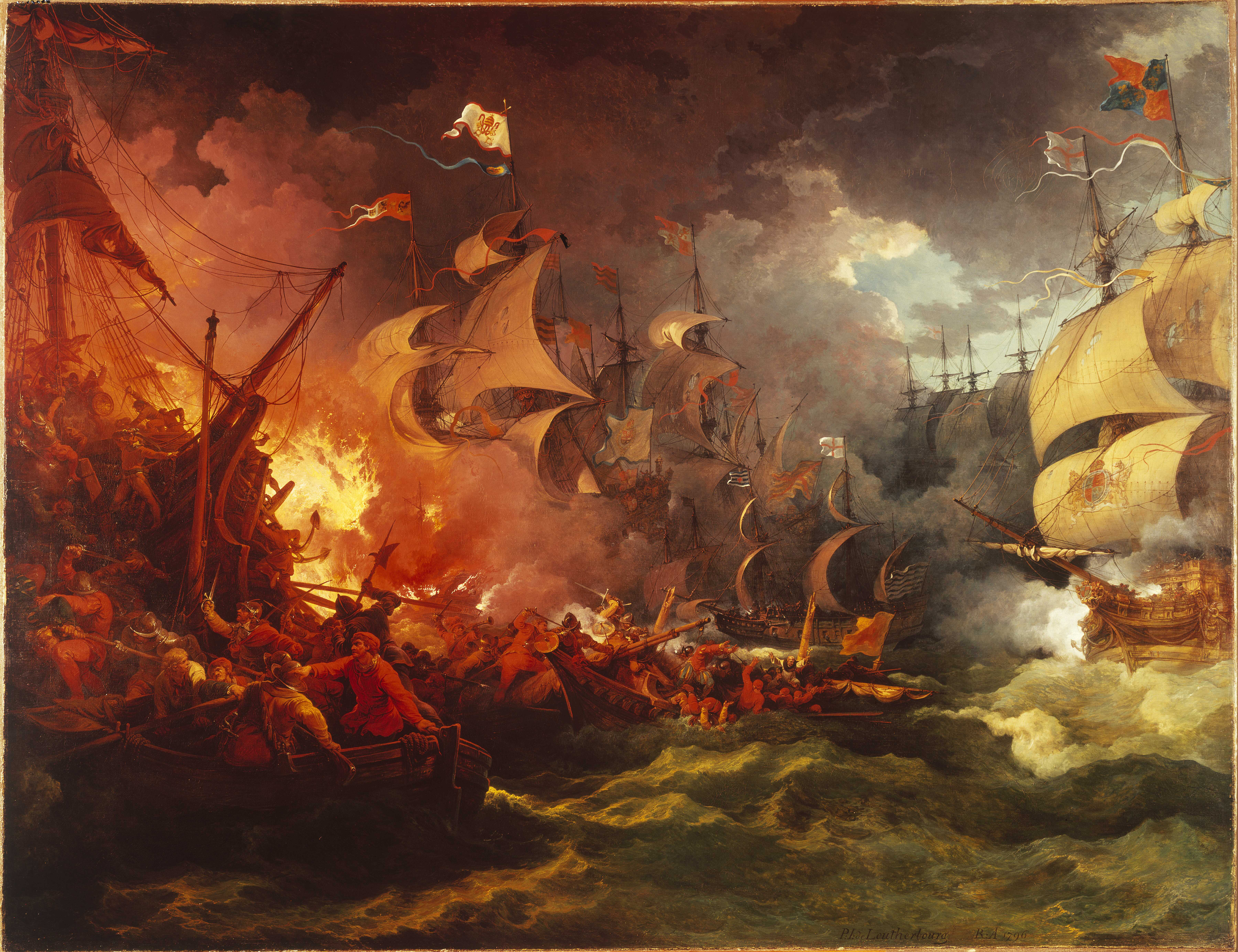
Battle of Gravelines, 1588

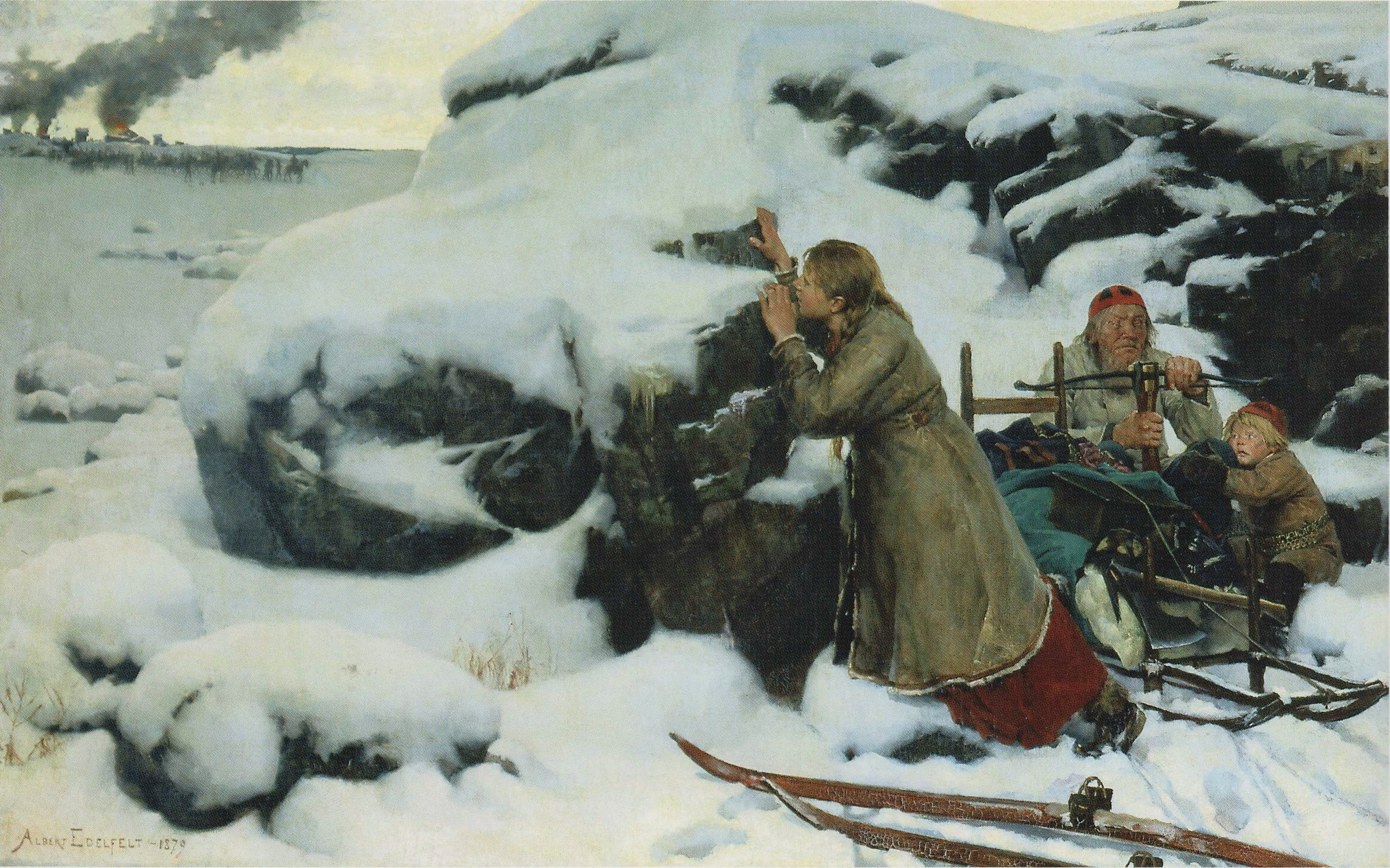
A Burned Village, during the Cudgel War, 1596

- c. 1500–1854 Lekianoba
- 1501–1512 Dano-Swedish War (1501–1512)
- 1502–1543 Guelders Wars
- 1503–1505 War of the Succession of Landshut
- 1508–1516 War of the League of Cambrai – 31,000 killed in action
- 1509–1510 Polish–Moldavian War
- 1514 Poor Conrad's Rebellion
- 1514 Dózsa rebellion
- 1514–1517 Saxon feud
- 1515 Slovene Peasant Revolt
- 1515–1523 Frisian peasant rebellion
- 1519–1521 Polish–Teutonic War
- 1520–1521 Revolt of the Comuneros
- 1521–1523 Revolt of the Brotherhoods
- 1521–1523 Swedish War of Liberation
- 1521–1526 Italian War of 1521–1526 – 30,000 killed in action
- 1521–1526 Hungarian-Ottoman War
  - 1526 Battle of Mohács
- 1522–1523 Knights' War
- 1524–1525 German Peasants' War
- 1526–1527 Jovan Nenad uprising
- 1526 Revolt of Espadán
- 1526–1530 War of the League of Cognac – 18,000 killed in action
- 1526–1528 Hungarian Civil War
- 1526–1527 Jovan Nenad uprising
- 1529 First War of Kappel
- 1529–1533 Habsburg–Ottoman war
- 1531 Second War of Kappel
- 1531–1532 War of Two Kings
- 1534 Silken Thomas Rebellion
- 1534–1535 Münster Rebellion
- 1534–1536 Count's Feud
- 1536–1537 Reformation in Norway
- 1536–1537 Pilgrimage of Grace
- 1540 Salt War
- 1540–1547 Habsburg–Ottoman war
- 1541-1566 Tahmasp I's Kakhetian and Kartlian campaigns
- 1542–1543 Dacke War
- 1542–1546 Italian War of 1542–1546 – 47,000 killed in action
- 1543–1550 Rough Wooing
- 1546–1547 Schmalkaldic War
- 1549 Kett's Rebellion
- 1549 Prayer Book Rebellion
- 1550 Battle of Sauðafell
- 1550–1558 Habsburg–Ottoman war
- 1551–1559 Italian War of 1551–1559 – 75,000 killed in action
- 1552–1555 Second Margrave War
- 1554 Wyatt's rebellion
- 1554–1557 Russo-Swedish War
- 1556–1567 Hungarian war of succession
- 1558–1583 Livonian War
- 1559–1564 Spanish-Ottoman War – 24,000 killed in action
- 1560 Siege of Leith
- 1562 First Székely uprising
- 1562–1598 French Wars of Religion
- 1563–1570 Northern Seven Years' War
- 1565 Great Siege of Malta
- 1565–1568 Habsburg–Ottoman war
- 1568–1570 Morisco Revolt
- 1568–1648 Eighty Years' War
- 1569–1580 Spanish-Ottoman War – 48,000 killed in action
- 1569–1570 Rising of the North
- 1569–1573 First Desmond Rebellion
- 1573 Croatian–Slovene Peasant Revolt
- 1575 Second Székely uprising
- 1578 Georgian-Ottoman War
- 1579–1583 Second Desmond Rebellion
- 1580–1583 War of the Portuguese Succession
- 1583–1588 Cologne War
- 1585–1604 English-Spanish War – 48,000 killed in action
- 1588–1654 Dutch–Portuguese War
- 1587–1588 War of the Polish Succession
- 1590–1595 Russo-Swedish War
- 1593 Battle of Sisak
- 1593–1606 Long Turkish War
- 1593–1617 Moldavian Magnate Wars
- 1594–1603 Nine Years' War (Ireland)
- 1595–1621 Moldavian Magnate Wars
- 1595 Battle of Călugăreni
- 1596 Third Székely uprising
- 1596–1597 Cudgel War
- 1598 First Tarnovo uprising
- 1598–1599 War against Sigismund
- 1599 Battle of Șelimbăr

== 17th century ==
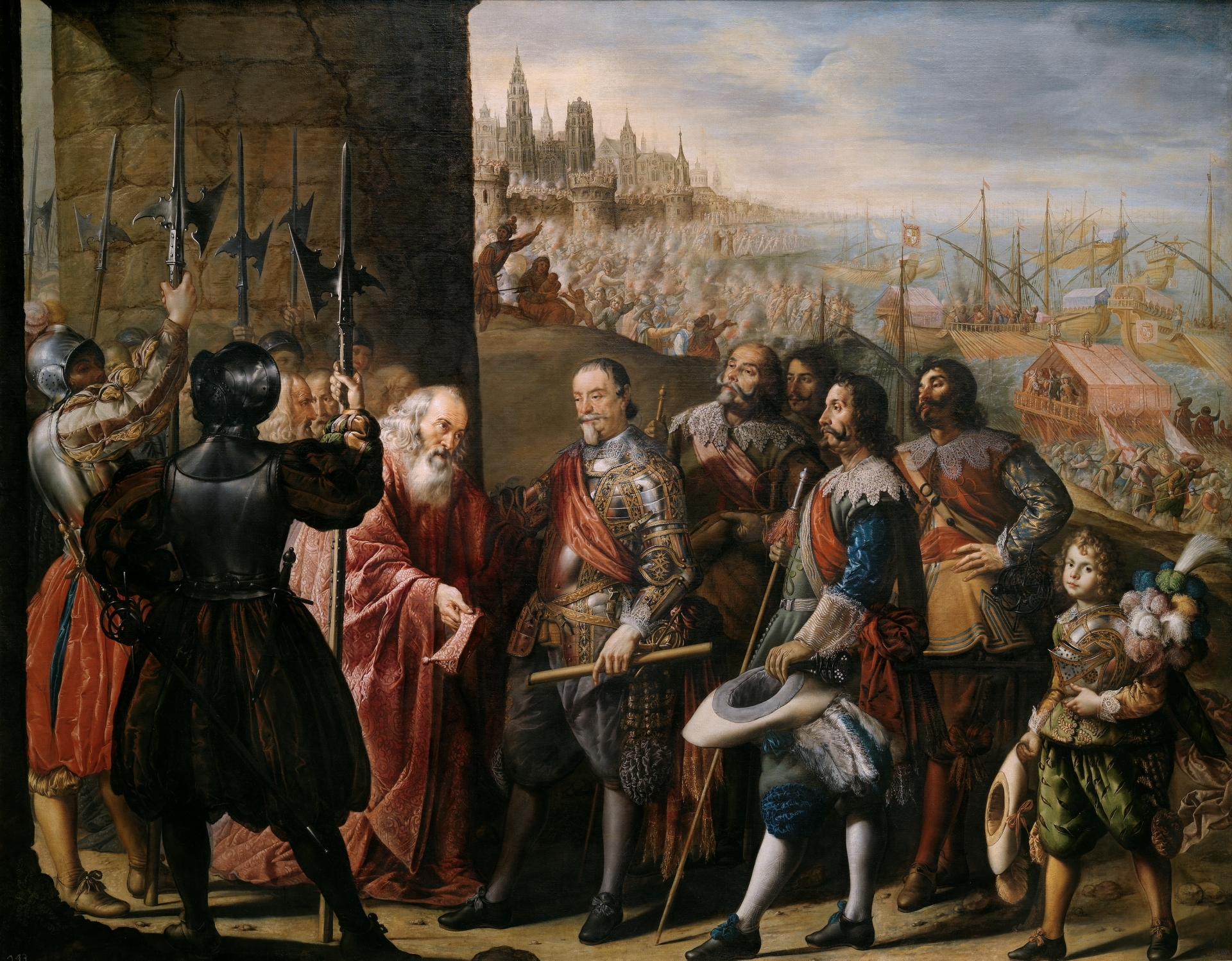
Relief of Genoa, 1625

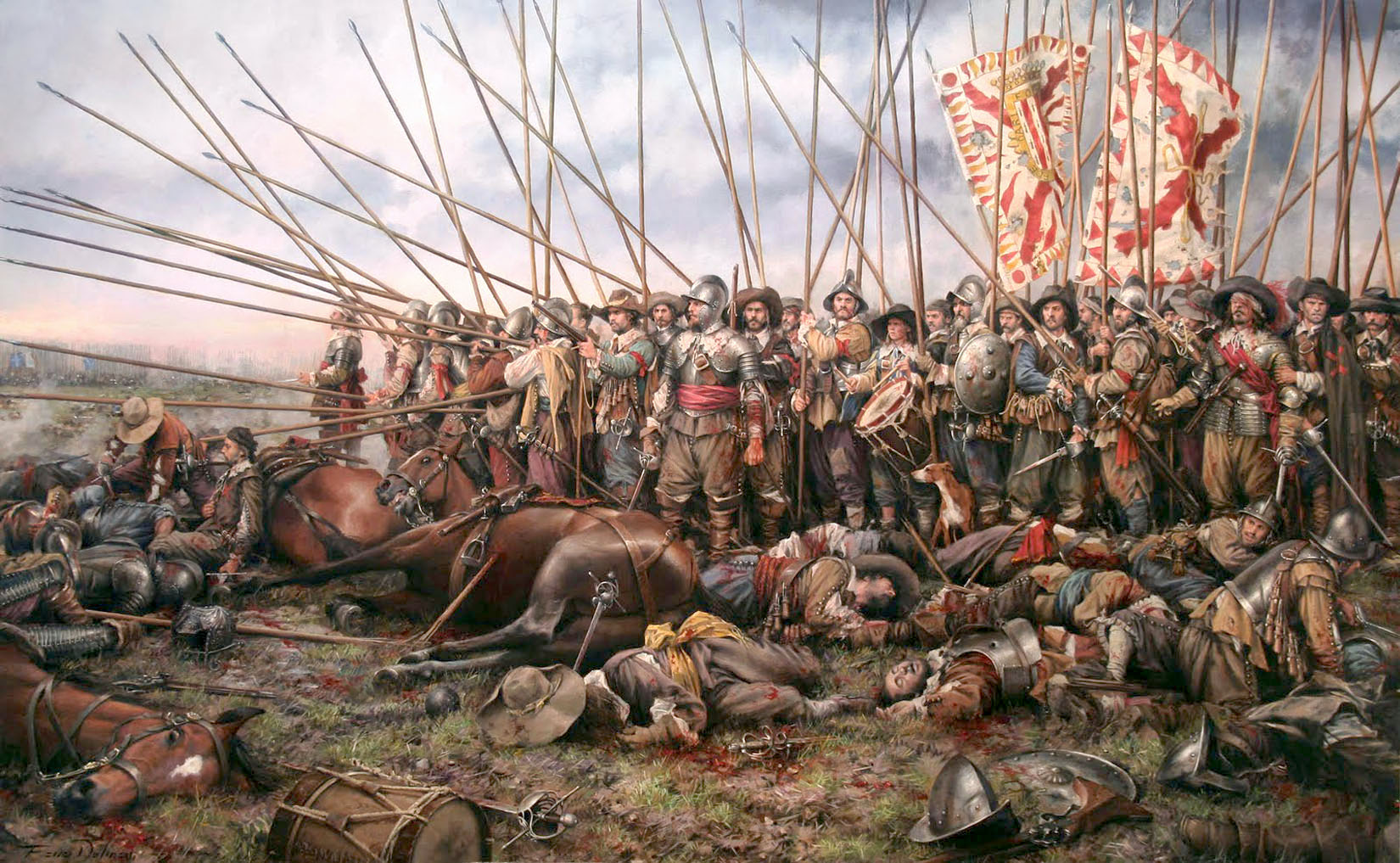
Battle of Rocroi, 1641

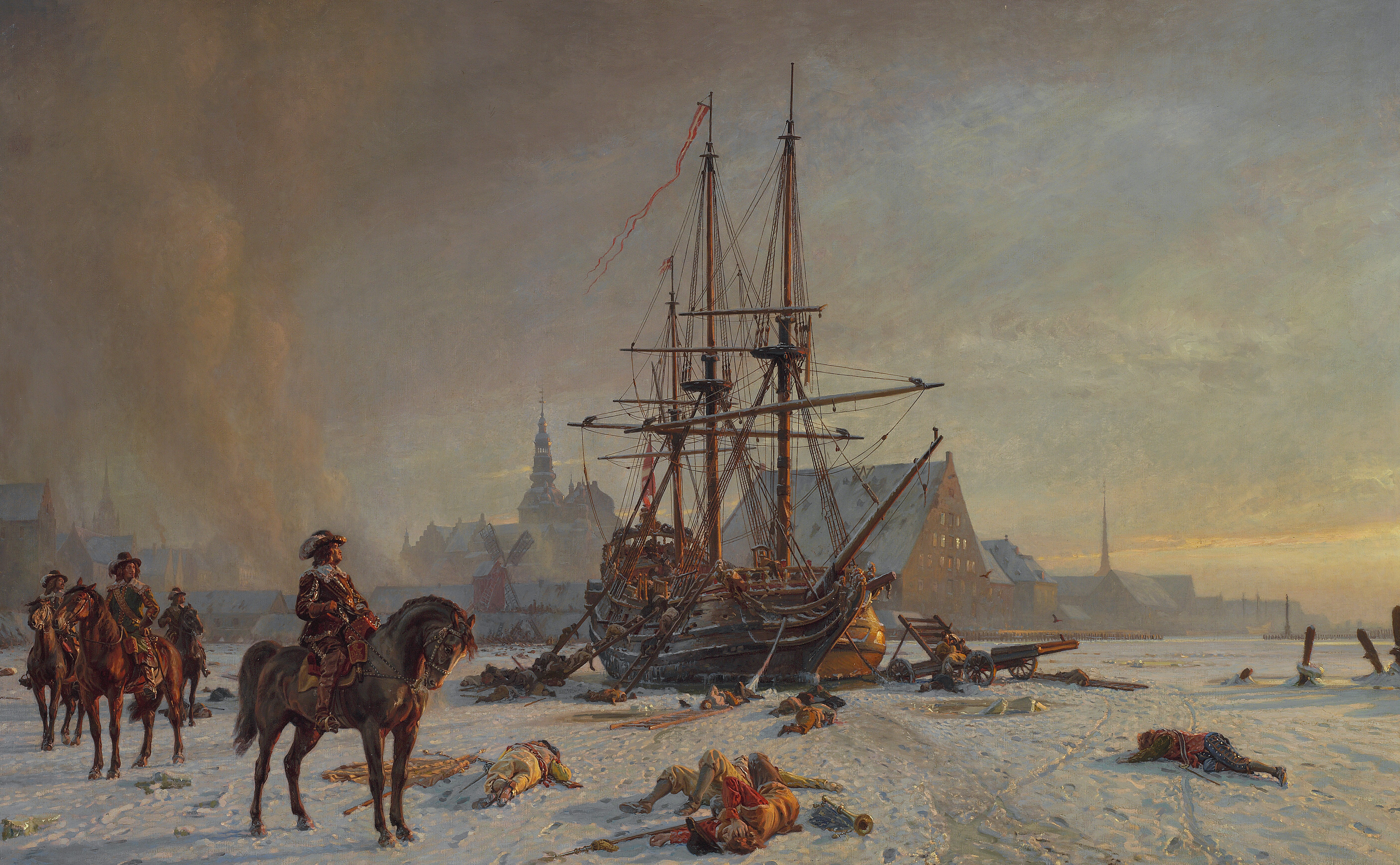
Morning after the Assault on Copenhagen, 1659

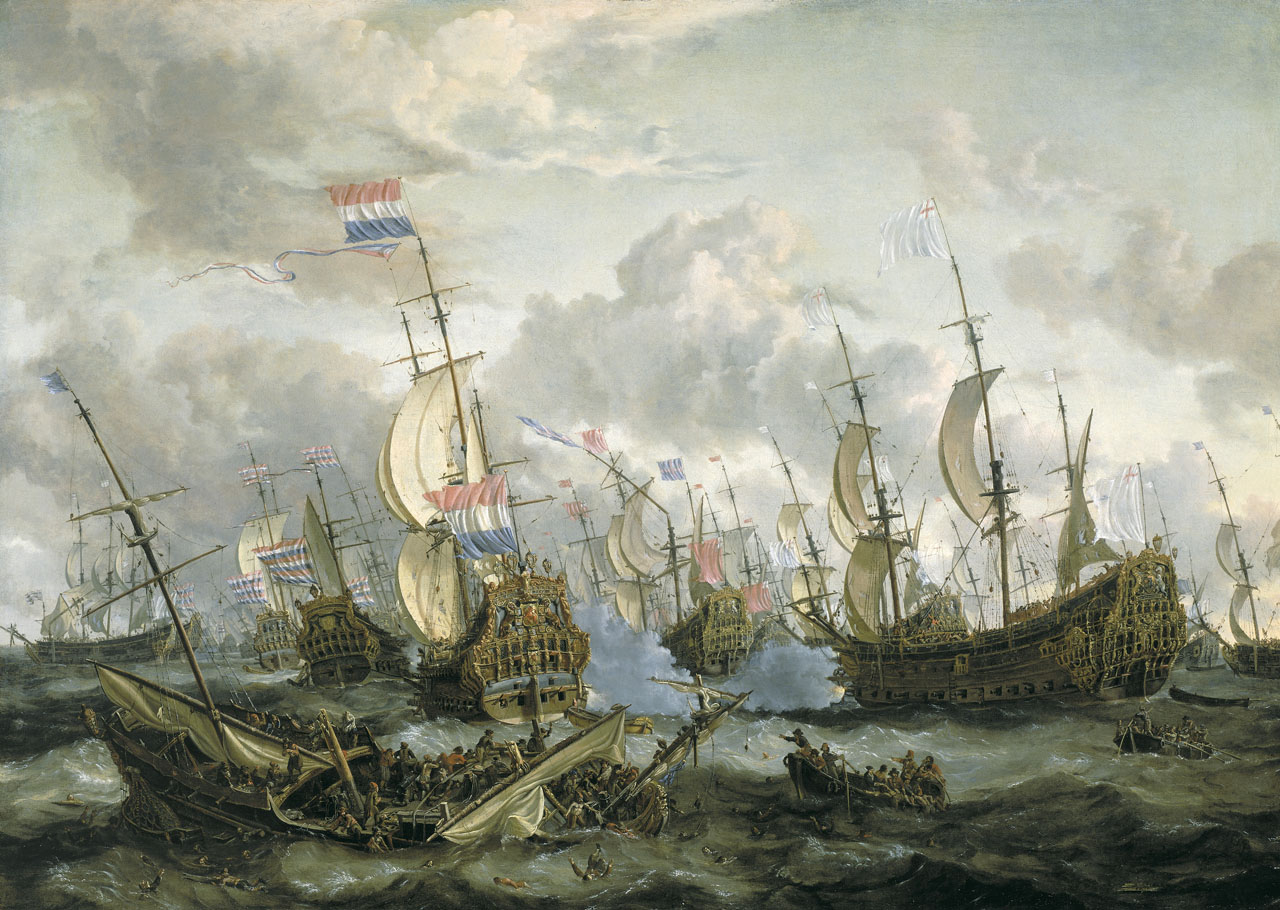
Four Days Battle, 1666

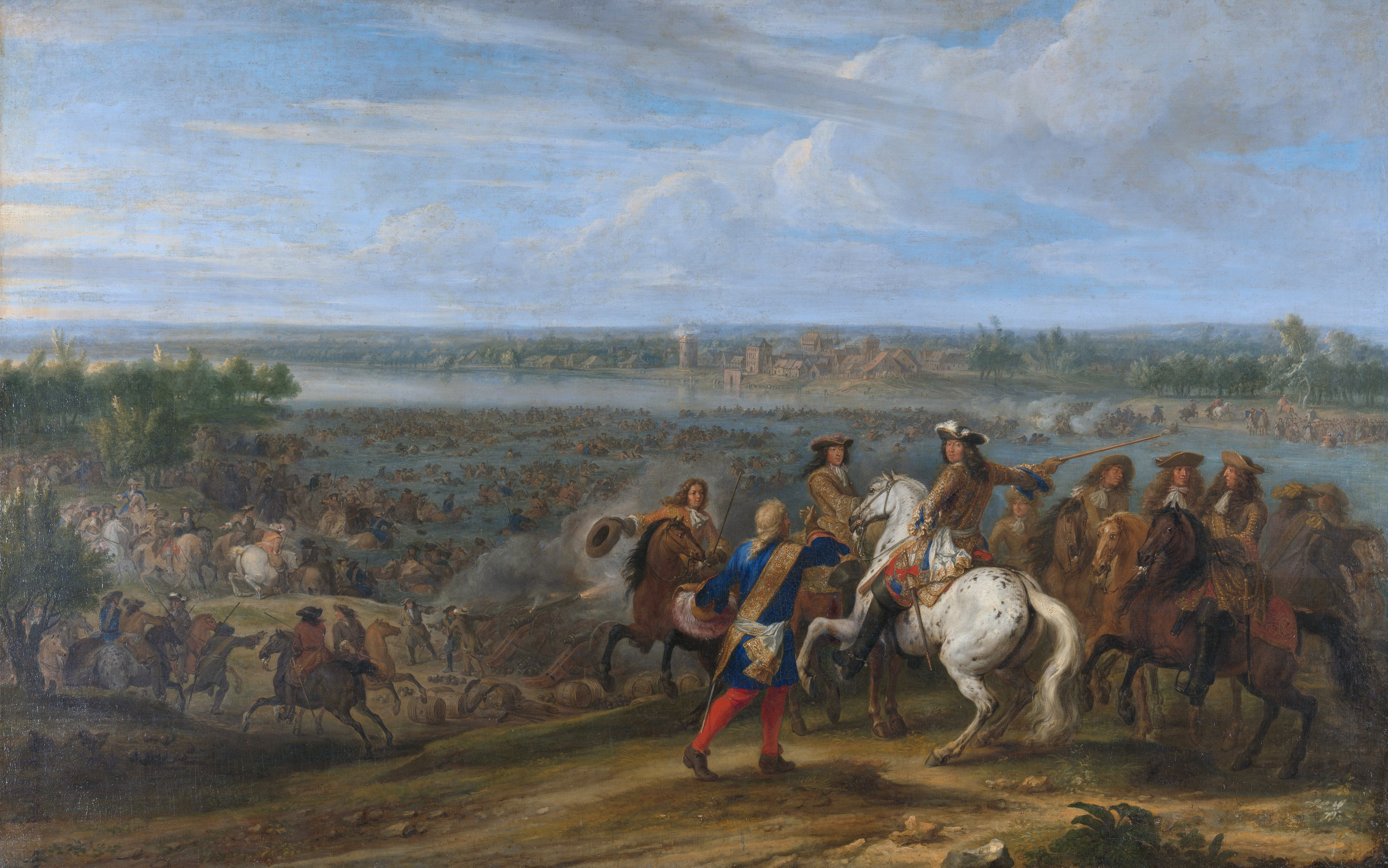
Louis XIV crosses the Rhine at Lobith, during the Franco-Dutch War, 1672

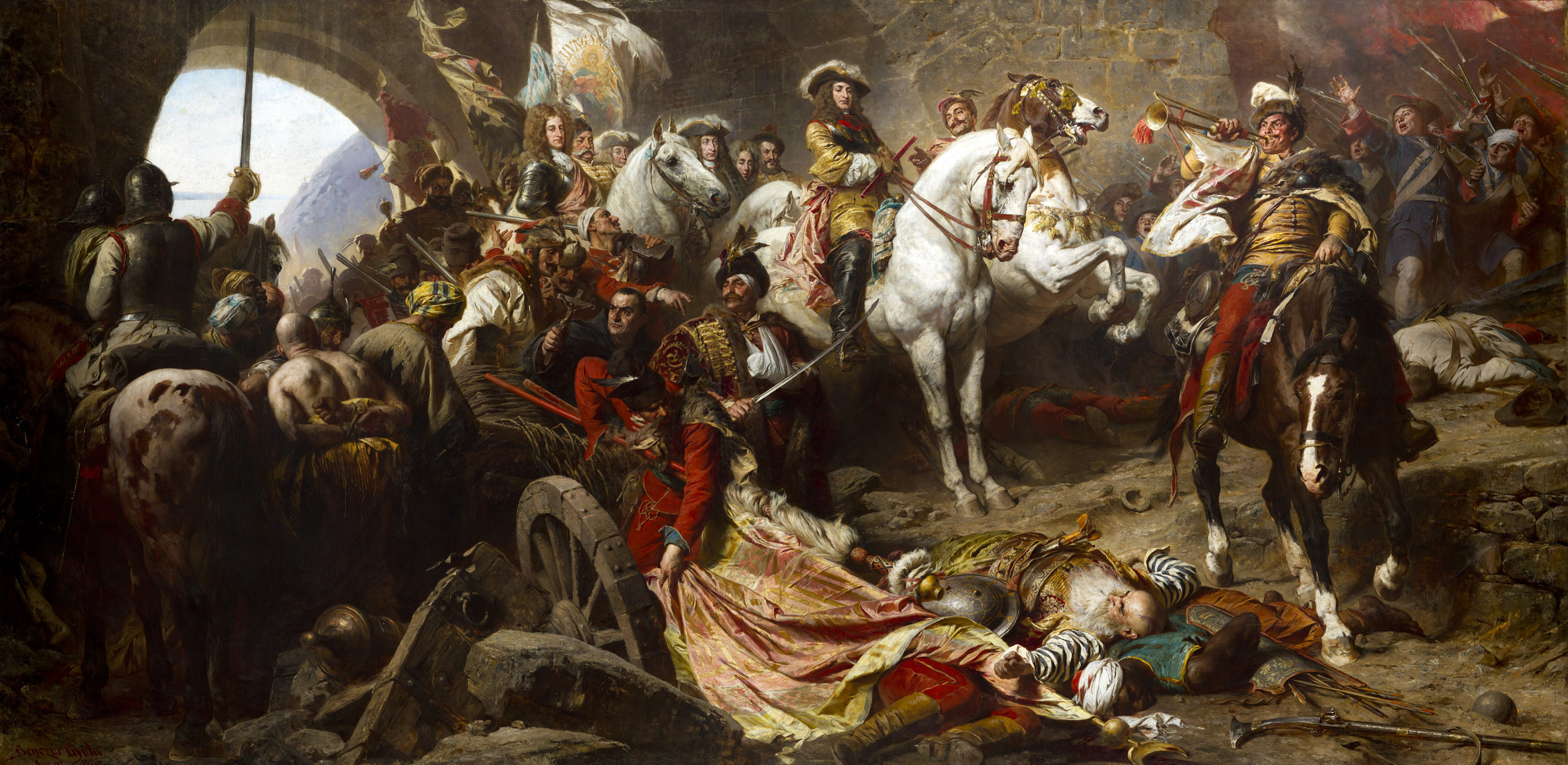
Siege of Buda, 1686

Battles of Barfleur and La Hougue, 1692

- 1600–1629 Polish–Swedish War
- 1601 Battle of Guruslău
- 1602 Savoyard escalade of Geneva
- 1604–1606 Bocskai Uprising
- 1605–1618 Polish–Muscovite War
- 1606–1607 Bolotnikov Rebellion
- 1606–1608 Zebrzydowski Rebellion
- 1610–1614 Spanish-Ottoman War – 15,000 killed in action
- 1610–1617 Ingrian War
- 1611–1613 Kalmar War
- 1614-1617 Abbas I's Kakhetian and Kartlian campaigns
- 1615–1618 Uskok War
- 1615–1617 Spanish-Savoian War – 2,000 killed in action
- 1617–1621 Spanish-Venetian War – 5,000 killed in action
- 1618–1619 Spanish-Ottoman War – 6,000 killed in action
- 1618–1648 Thirty Years' War
  - 1624–1625 Siege of Breda – Spain vs. Holland, England
  - 1635 Siege of Leuven – Spain vs. Holland, France
  - 1637 Battle off Lizard Point – Spain vs. Holland
  - 1638 Battle of Getaria – France vs. Spain
  - 1639 Battle of the Downs – Spain vs. Holland
  - 1643 Battle of Rocroi – France vs. Spain
  - 1648 Battle of Lens – France vs. Spain
- 1618–1639 Bündner Wirren
- 1620–1621 Polish–Ottoman War
- 1623-1658 Georgian civil war of 1623–1658
- 1625 Zhmaylo Uprising
- 1627–1629 Anglo-French War
- 1628–1631 War of the Mantuan Succession
- 1630 Fedorovych Uprising
- 1632–1634 Smolensk War
- 1637 Pavlyuk Uprising
- 1638 Ostryanyn Uprising
- 1639–1653 Wars of the Three Kingdoms
  - 1639–1640 Bishops' Wars
  - 1641–1653 Irish Confederate Wars
  - 1642–1651 English Civil War
    - 1642–1646 First English Civil War
    - 1648–1649 Second English Civil War
    - 1649–1651 Third English Civil War
  - 1649–1653 Cromwellian conquest of Ireland
- 1640–1668 Spanish-Portuguese War – 80,000 killed in action
- 1648–1659 Franco-Spanish War – 108,000 killed in action
- 1648–1657 Khmelnytsky Uprising
- 1651 Kostka-Napierski Uprising
- 1651–1986 Three Hundred and Thirty Five Years' War
- 1652–1674 Anglo-Dutch Wars
- 1653 Swiss peasant war of 1653
- 1654 First Bremian War
- 1654–1667 Russo-Polish War
- 1654–1660 English-Spanish War – 15,000 killed in action
- 1655–1660 Second Northern War
- 1656 War of Villmergen
- 1657 Transylvanian campaign into Poland
- 1657–1662 Ottoman–Transylvanian war
- 1659 Kakhetian Uprising (1659)
- 1663–1664 Austro-Turkish War
- 1666 Second Bremian War
- 1666–1671 Polish–Cossack–Tatar War
- 1667–1668 War of Devolution – 4,000 killed in action
- 1670–1671 Razin's Rebellion
- 1672 First Kuruc Uprising
- 1672-1676 Polish-Ottoman War (1672–1676)
- 1672–1678 Franco-Dutch War – 342,000 killed in action
- 1672–1673 Second Genoese–Savoyard War
- 1675–1679 Scanian War
- 1676–1681 Russo-Ottoman War
- 1678–1685 Thököly Uprising
- 1679 Covenanter Rebellion
- 1683–1684 War of the Reunions – 5,000 killed in action
- 1683–1699 War of the Holy League – 384,000 killed in action
- 1685 Monmouth Rebellion
- 1686 Second Tarnovo uprising
- 1688 Chiprovtsi uprising
- 1688–1697 Nine Years' War – 680,000 killed in action
  - 1688 Glorious Revolution
- 1689 Karposh's rebellion
- 1689–1692 First Jacobite Rising
- 1700 Lithuanian Civil War

== 18th century ==
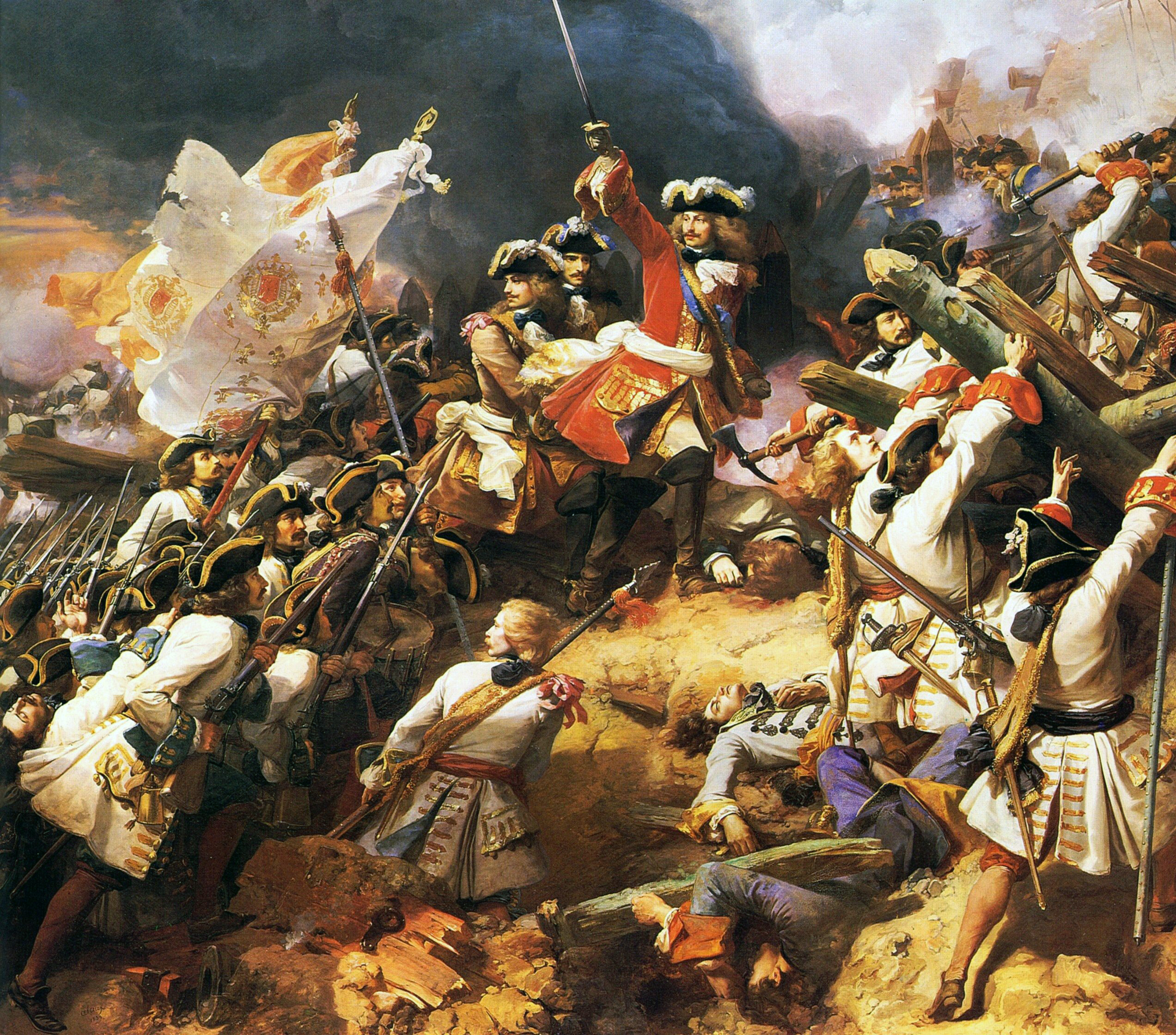
Battle of Denain, 1712

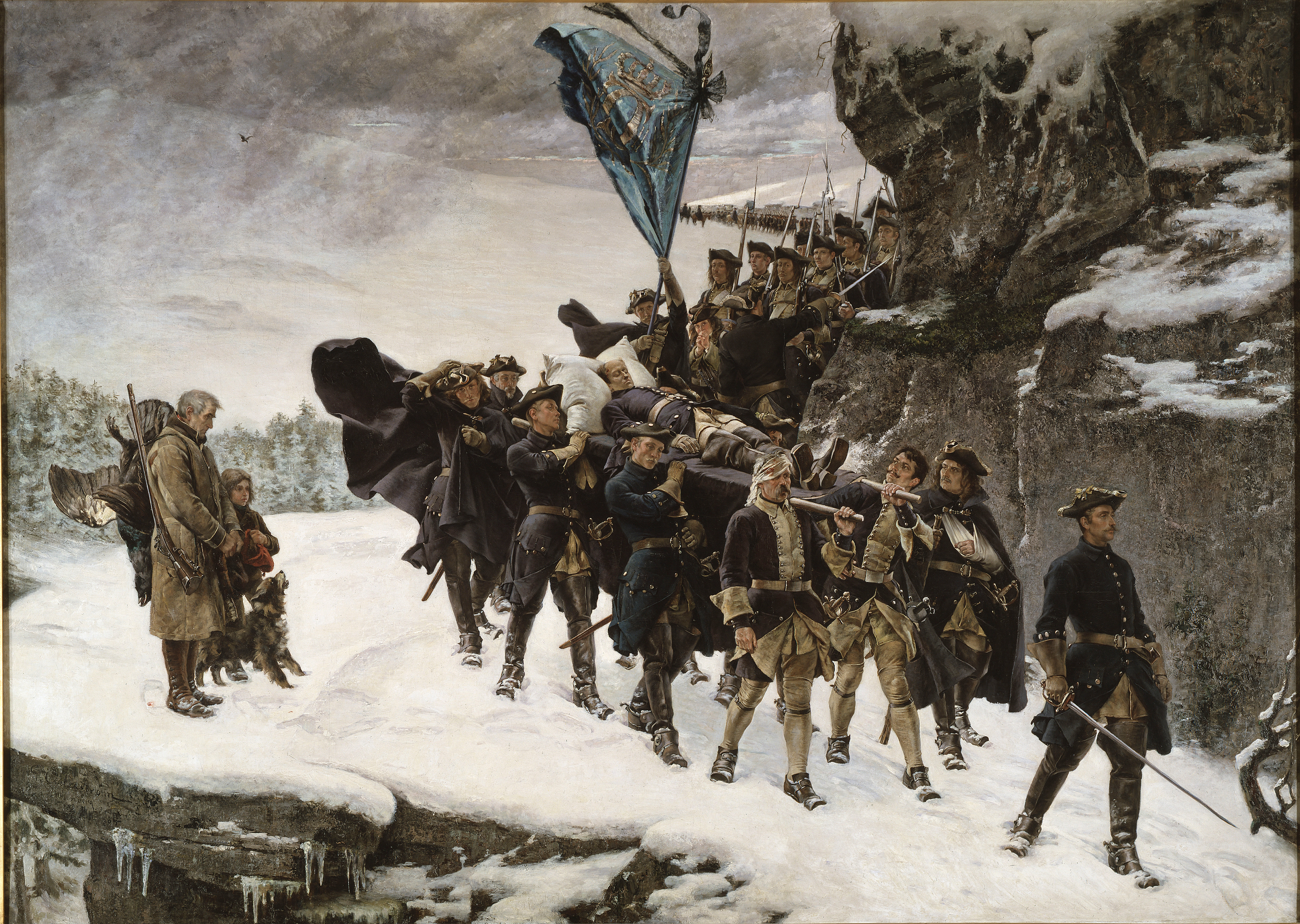
Bringing Home the Body of King Charles XII of Sweden, after the Siege of Fredriksten, 1718

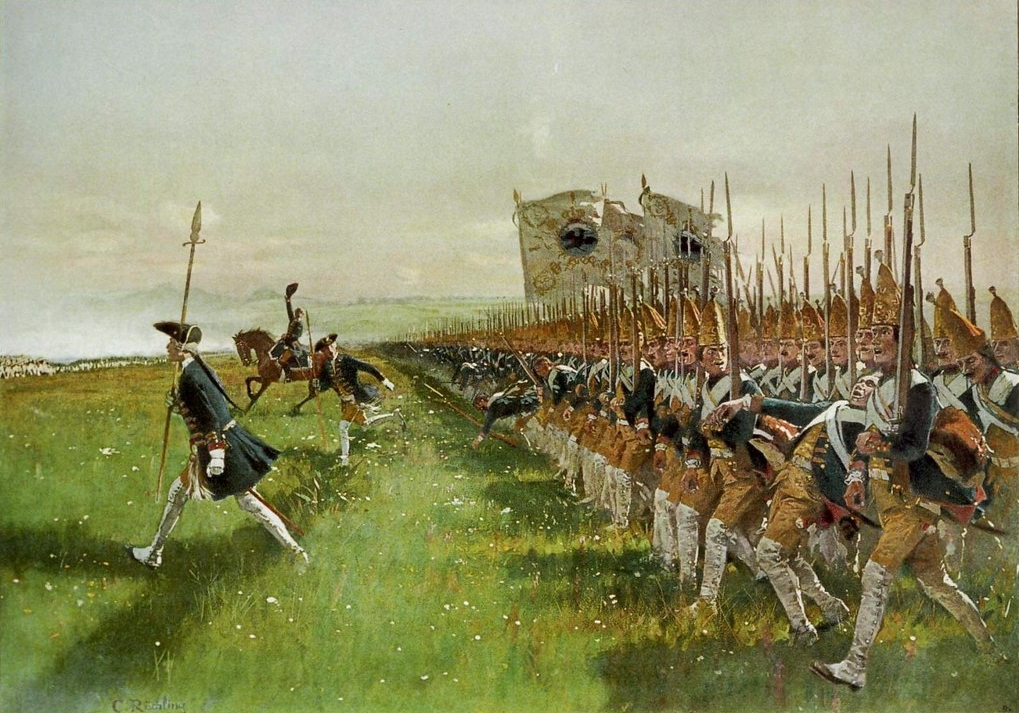
Battle of Hohenfriedberg, 1745

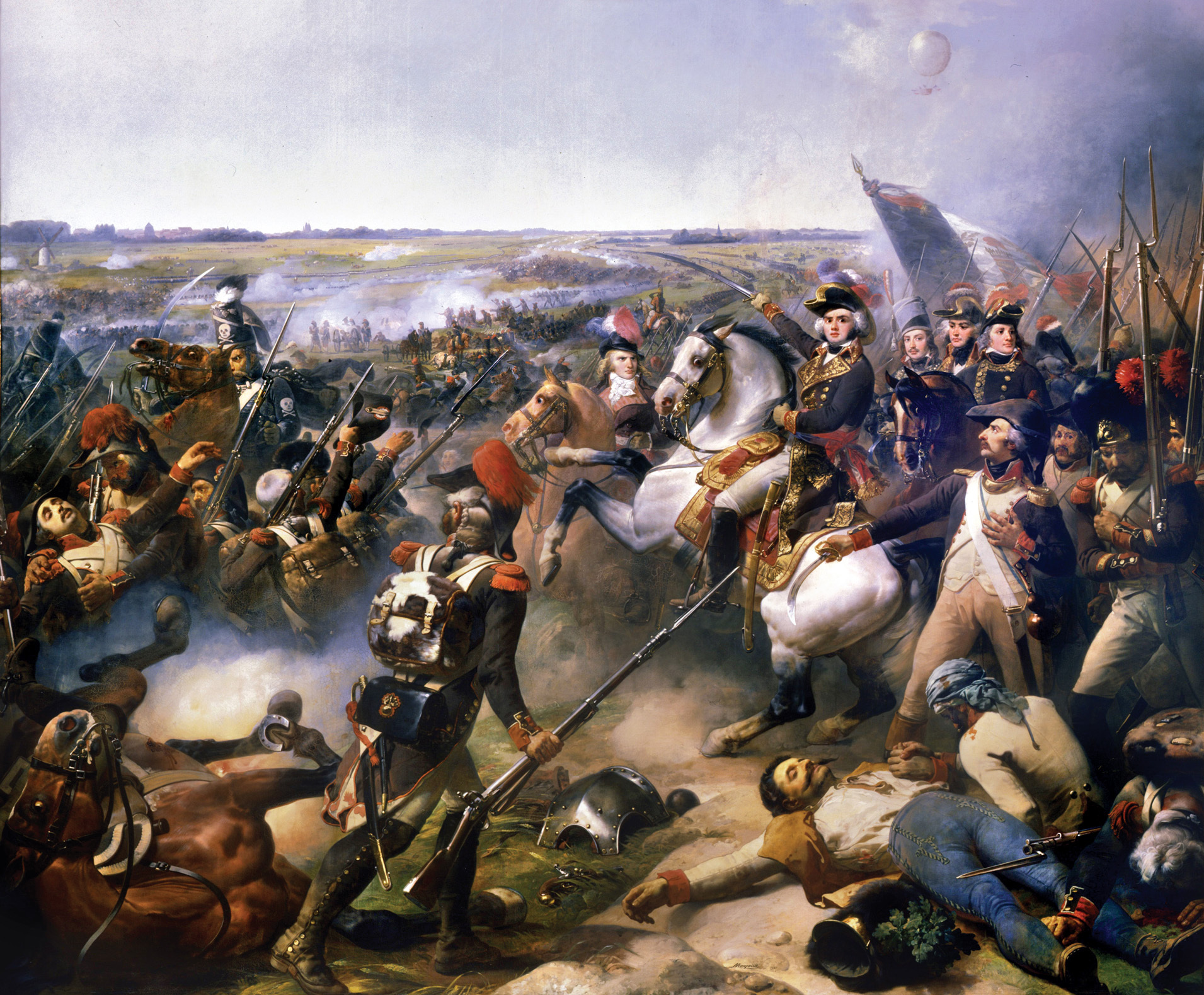
Battle of Fleurus, 1794

- 1700–1721 Great Northern War – 30,000 Russians killed in action
- 1701–1714 War of the Spanish Succession – 1,251,000 killed in action
  - 1713-1714 War of the Catalans
  - 1703–1711 Rákóczi's War of Independence
- 1707–1708 Bulavin Rebellion
- 1710-1713 Russo-Ottoman War
- 1712 Toggenburg War
- 1714–1718 Ottoman–Venetian wars
- 1715–1716 Jacobite rising of 1715
- 1716–1718 Austro-Turkish War
- 1718–1720 War of the Quadruple Alliance – 25,000 killed in action
- 1722-1864 Russo-Circassian War
- 1722–1723 Russo-Persian War
- 1727–1729 Anglo-Spanish War – 15,000 killed in action
- 1733–1738 War of the Polish Succession – 88,000 killed in action
- 1735–1739 Russo-Turkish War
- 1740–1748 War of the Austrian Succession – 359,000 killed in action
- 1740–1763 Silesian Wars
- 1741–1743 Russo-Swedish War
- 1745–1746 Jacobite rising of 1745
- 1756–1763 Seven Years' War – 992,000 killed in action
- 1757 Battle of Khresili
- 1763–1864 Russo-Circassian War
- 1768–1772 War of the Bar Confederation
- 1768–1774 Russo-Ottoman War
- 1770 Battle of Aspindza
- 1770 Orlov Revolt
- 1774–1775 Pugachev's Rebellion
- 1775–1783 American Revolutionary War
- 1778–1779 War of the Bavarian Succession
- 1784 Kettle War
- 1784–1785 Revolt of Horea, Cloșca and Crișan
- 1785 Battle of the Sunja
- 1787 Dutch Patriot Revolt
- 1787–1792 Russo-Ottoman War
- 1788–1790 Russo-Swedish War
- 1789–1802 French Revolutionary Wars – 663,000 killed in action
- 1790 Saxon Peasants' Revolt
- 1792 Polish–Russian War of 1792
- 1794 Kościuszko Uprising
- 1795 Battle of Krtsanisi
- 1798 Irish Rebellion of 1798
- 1798 Peasants' War

== 19th century ==
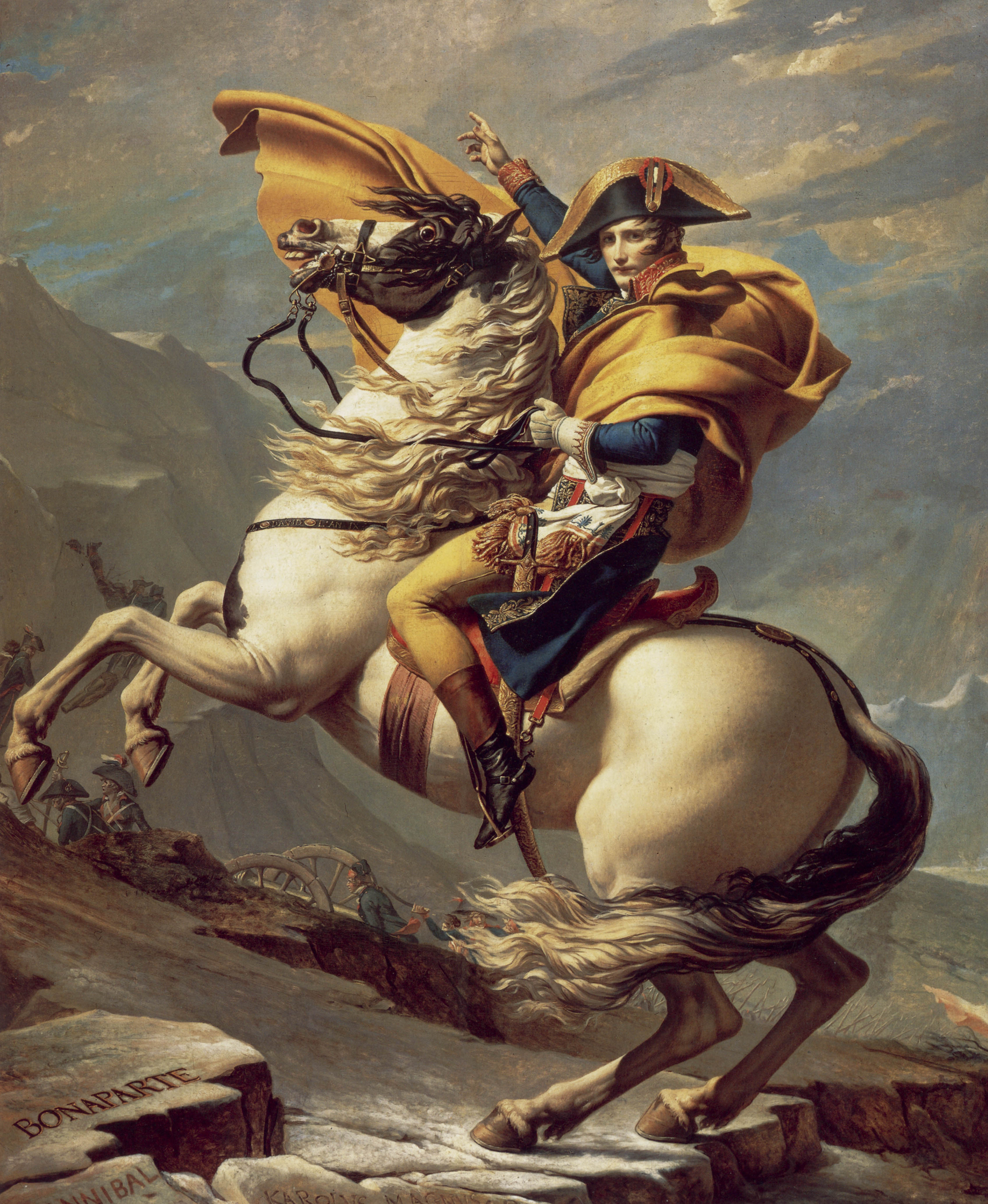
Napoleon crossing the Alps before the Battle of Marengo, 1800

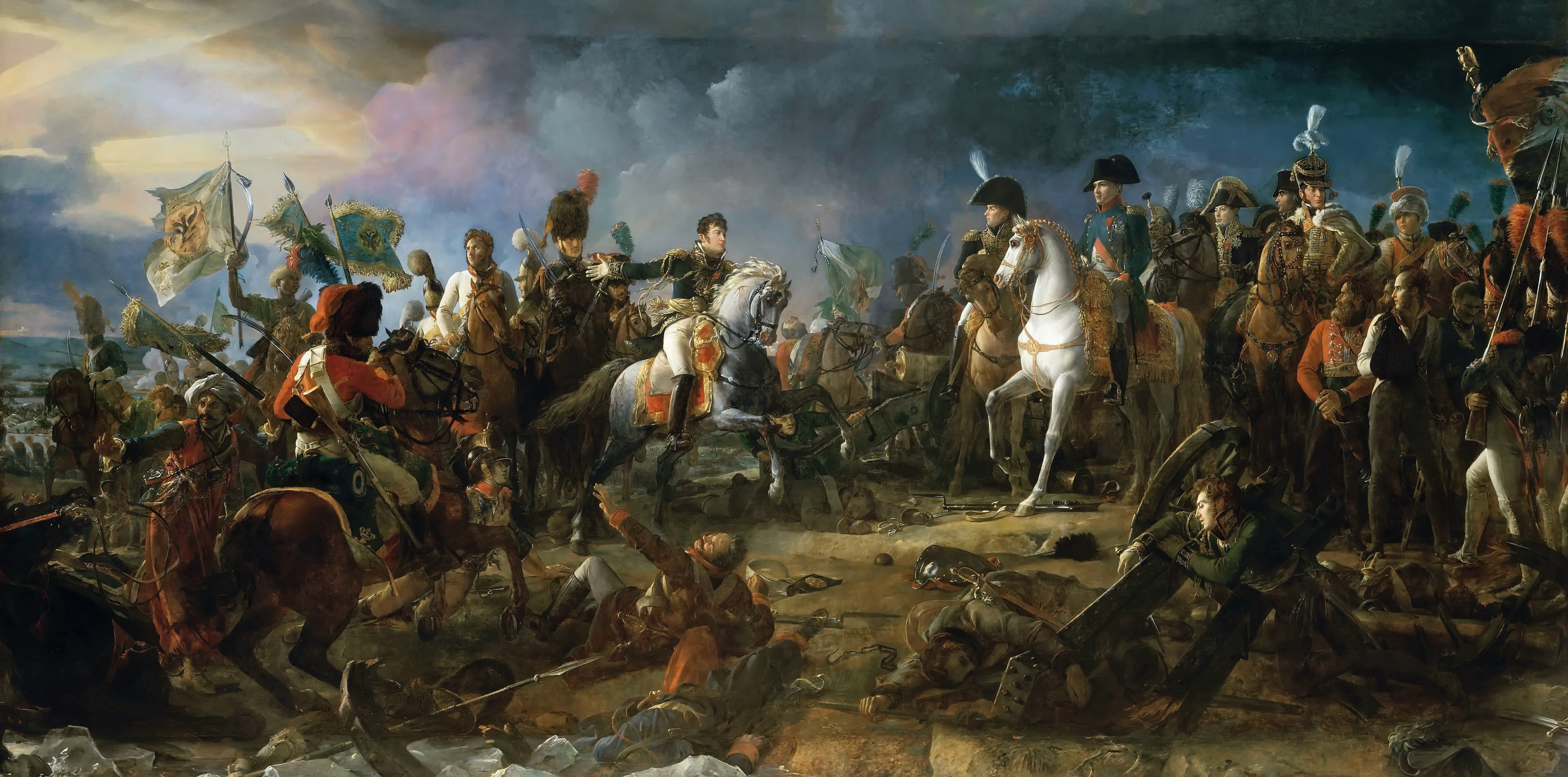
Battle of Austerlitz, 1805

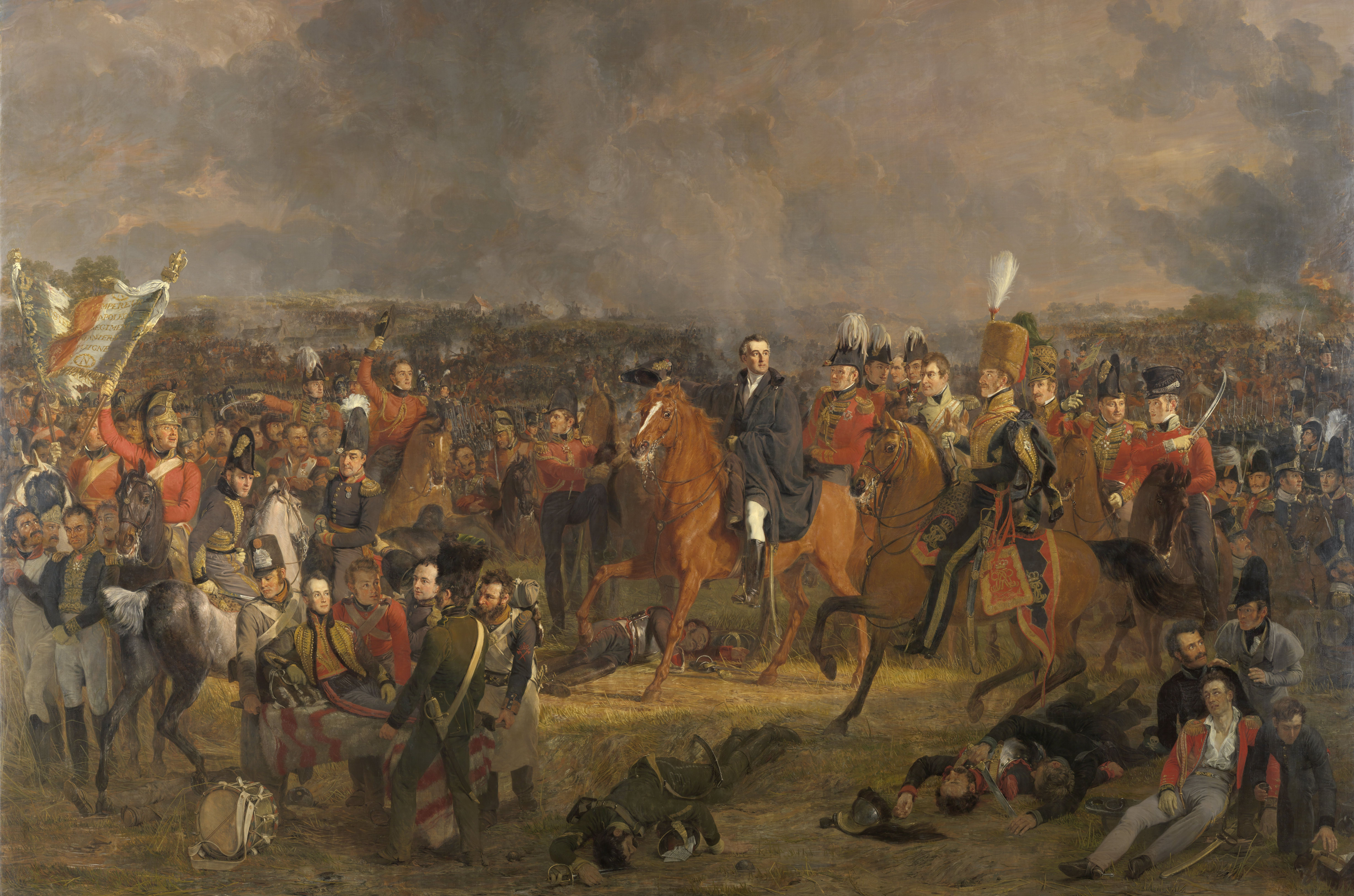
Battle of Waterloo, 1815

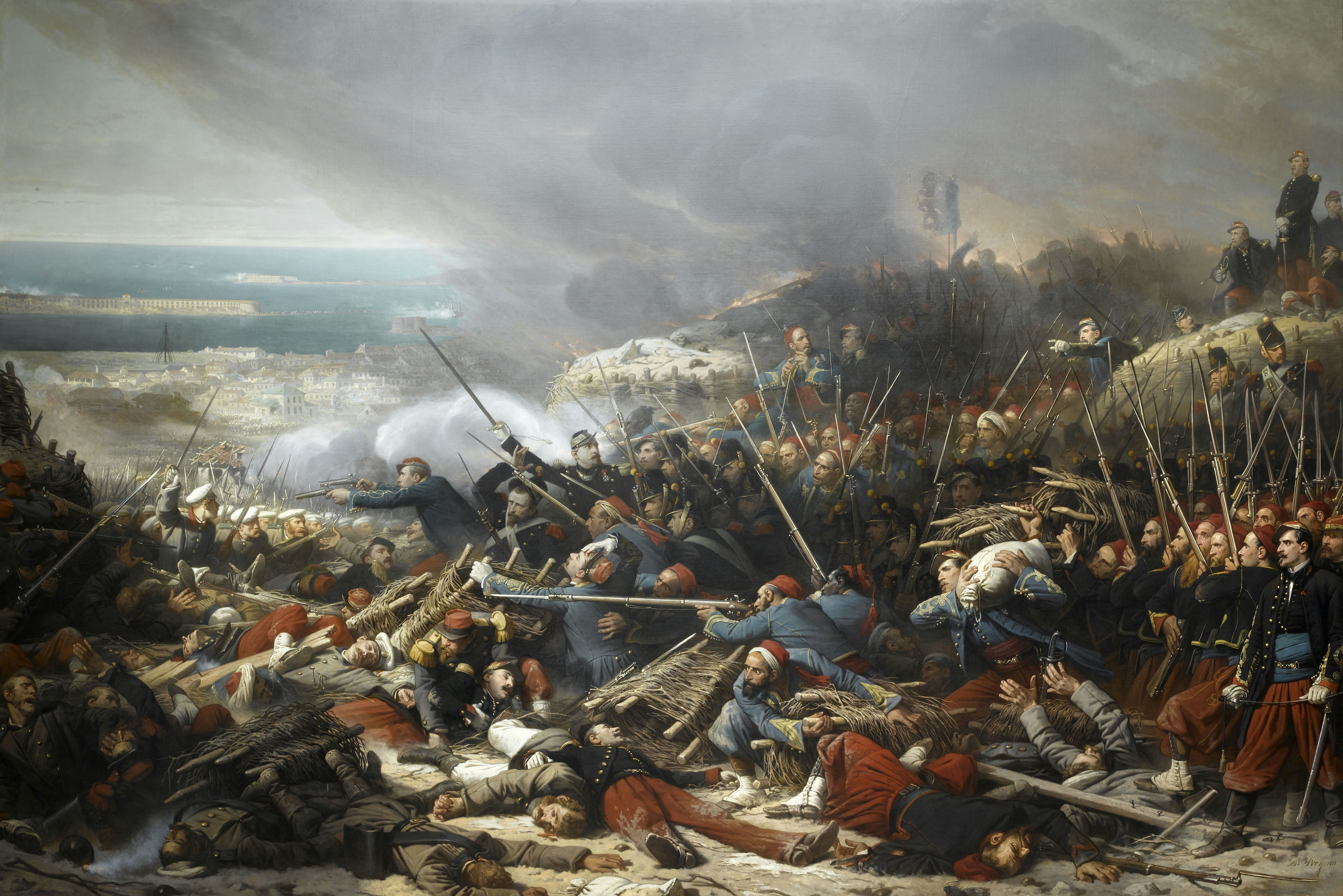
Battle of Malakoff, 1855

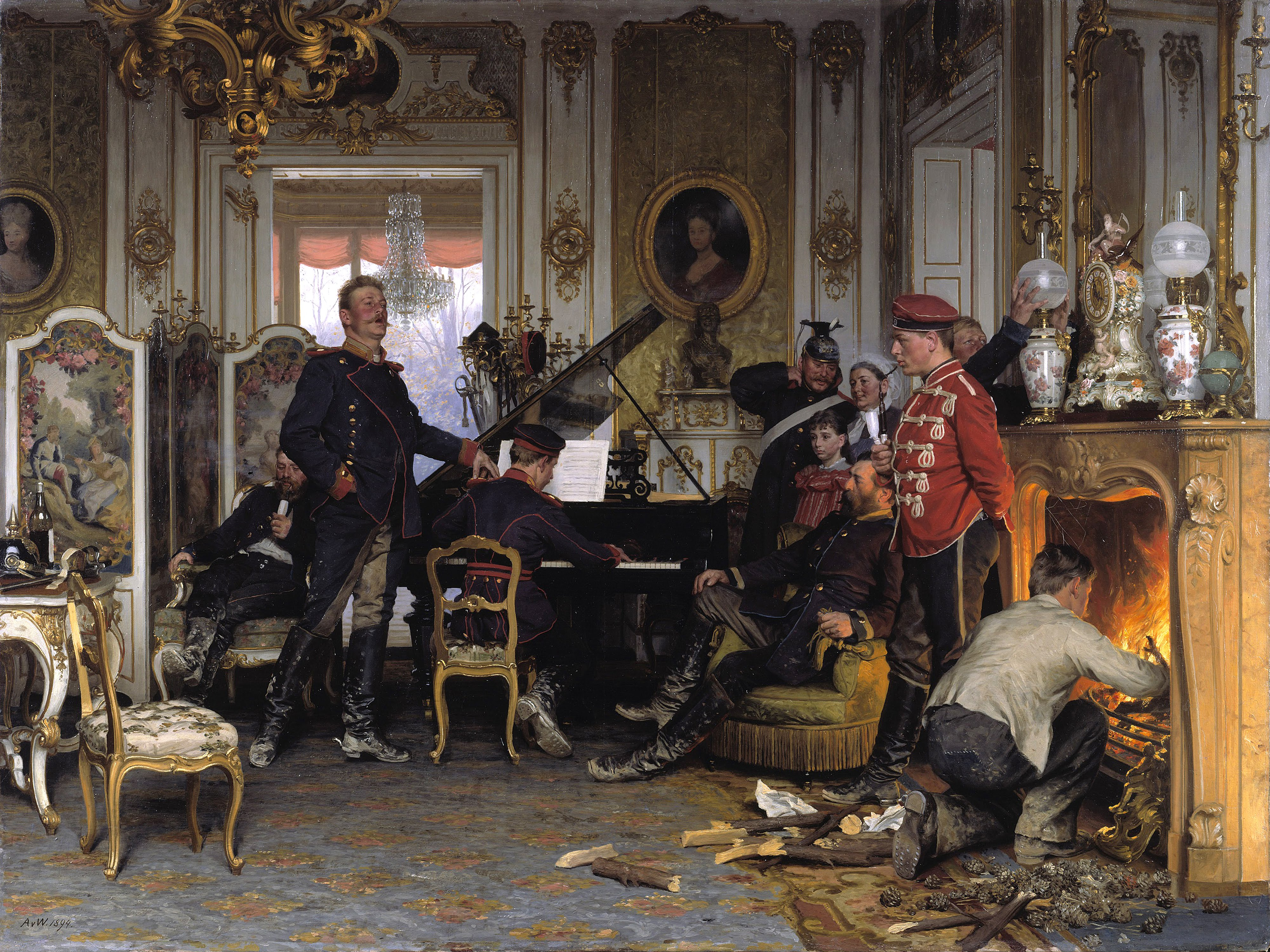
Prussian troops quarter just outside Paris, Franco-Prussian War, 1871

- 1803 Irish Rebellion of 1803
- 1803 Souliote War
- 1803–1815 Napoleonic Wars
- 1804–1813 First Serbian Uprising
- 1804 1804 Mtiuleti rebellion
- 1804–1813 Russo-Persian War
- 1806–1812 Russo-Ottoman War
- 1808–1809 Finnish War
- 1809 Polish–Austrian War
- 1812 Kakhetian Uprising (1812)
- 1815–1817 Second Serbian Uprising
- 1817–1864 Russian conquest of the Caucasus
- 1821–1829 Greek War of Independence
- 1821 Wallachian uprising
- 1823 French invasion of Spain
- 1826–1828 Russo-Persian War
- 1827 War of the Aggrieved
- 1828–1829 Russo-Ottoman War
- 1828–1834 Liberal Wars
- 1830 July Revolution
- 1830 Belgian Revolution
- 1831 Ten Days' Campaign
- 1830–1831 November Uprising
- 1831 Canut revolts
- 1831–1832 Bosnian Uprising
- 1831–1836 Tithe War
- 1832 War in the Vendée and Chouannerie of 1832
- 1832 June Rebellion
- 1832 Siege of Antwerp
- 1833–1839 First Carlist War
- 1833–1839 Albanian Revolts of 1833–39
- 1843–1844 Albanian Revolt of 1843–44
- 1846 Galician slaughter
- 1846 Revolution of Maria da Fonte
- 1846 Solís Uprising
- 1846–1849 Second Carlist War
- 1846–1847 Patuleia
- 1847 Albanian Revolt of 1847
- 1847 Sonderbund War
- 1848–1849 Hungarian Revolution and War of Independence
- 1848–1851 First Schleswig War
- 1848–1849 First Italian War of Independence
- 1852-1853 Montenegrin–Ottoman War
- 1853–1856 Crimean War
- 1854 Epirus Revolt of 1854
- 1858 Mahtra War
- 1859 Second Italian War of Independence
- 1861–1862 Montenegrin–Ottoman War
- 1863–1864 January Uprising
- 1864 Second Schleswig War
- 1866 Austro-Prussian War
- 1866–1869 Cretan Revolt
- 1866 Third Italian War of Independence
- 1867 Fenian Rising
- 1869 Krivošije uprising
- 1870–1871 Franco-Prussian War
- 1872–1876 Third Carlist War
- 1873–1874 Cantonal Revolution
- 1875–1877 Herzegovina uprising
- 1876–1878 Serbian–Ottoman War
- 1876 Bulgarian April Uprising
  - 1876 Razlovtsi insurrection
- 1876–1878 Montenegrin–Ottoman War
- 1877–1878 Russo-Ottoman War
- 1878–1879 Kresna–Razlog uprising
- 1878 Epirus Revolt of 1878
- 1878 Austro-Hungarian Occupation of Bosnia
- 1885 Bulgarian unification
- 1885 Serbo-Bulgarian War
- 1897 Thirty Days' War

== 20th century ==
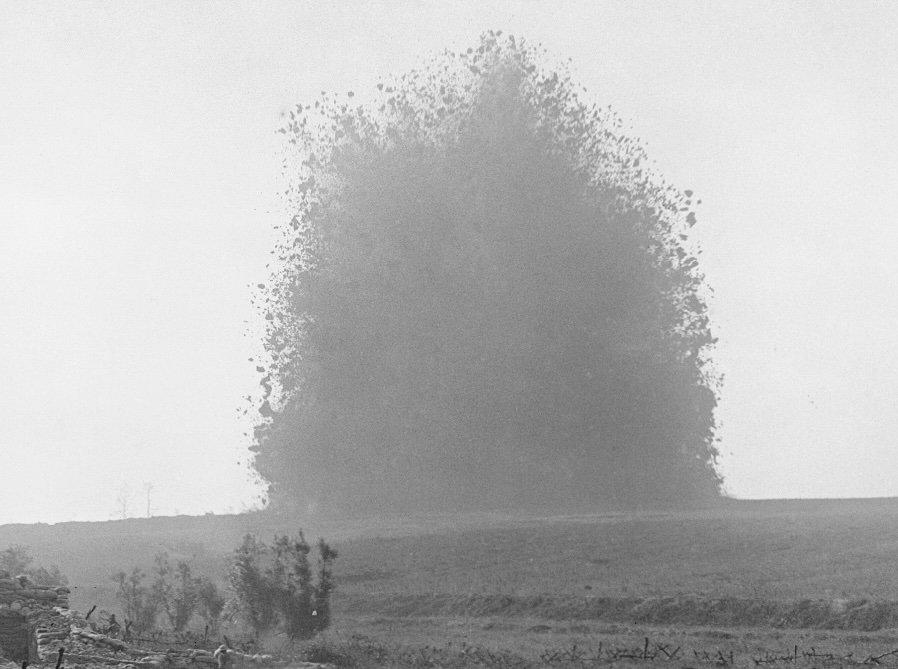
Explosion of the Hawthorn Ridge mine, 1 July 1916, marked the beginning of the Battle of the Somme.

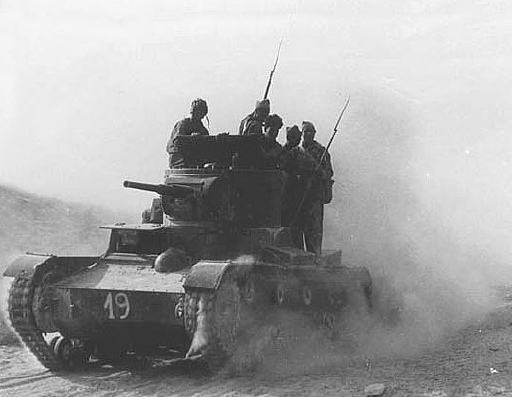
Republican International Brigadiers on a Soviet T-26 tank at the Battle of Belchite, 1937

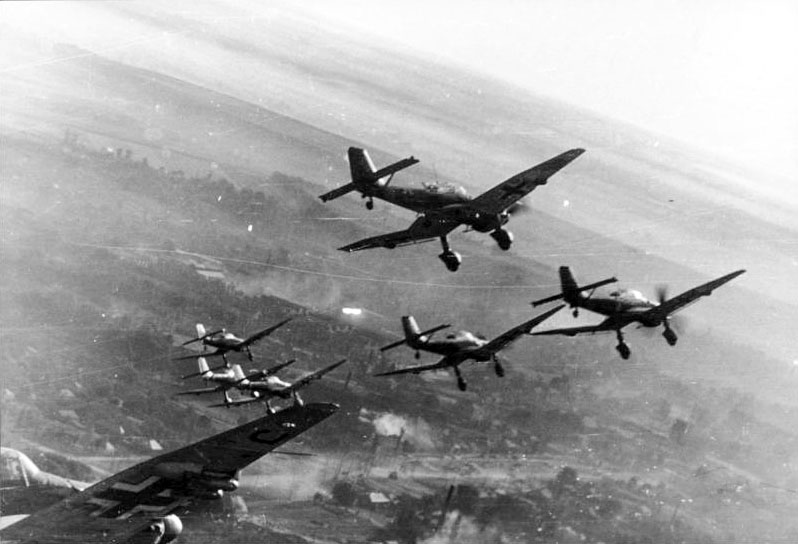
German Stuka dive bombers in the Eastern Front (World War II) 1941–45

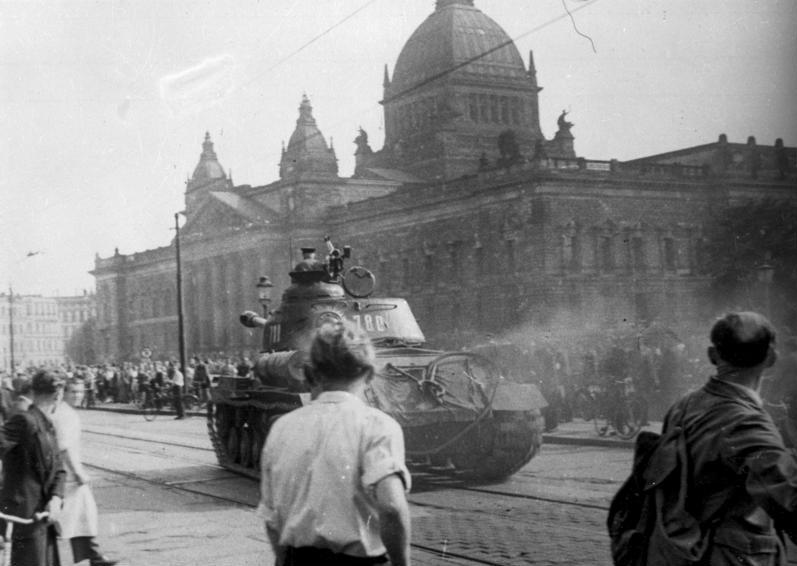
A Soviet IS-2 tank in Leipzig during the 1953 East Germany Uprising

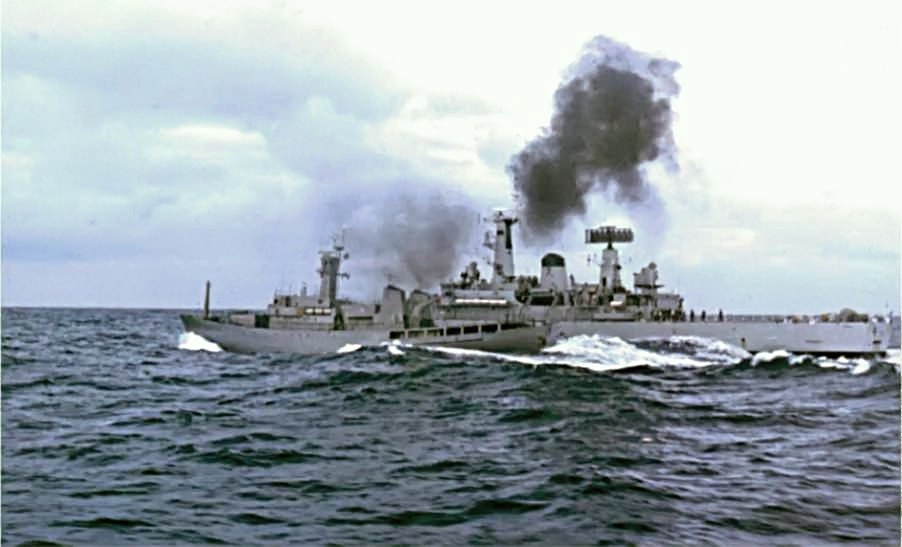
Icelandic patrol ship ICGV Odinn and British frigate HMS Scylla clash during the Second Cod War

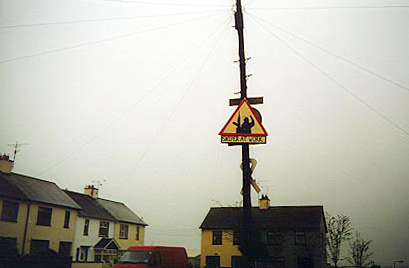
A "Sniper at work" sign in Crossmaglen, a symbol of the IRA sniper campaign in South Armagh during the last stages of the Northern Ireland Troubles

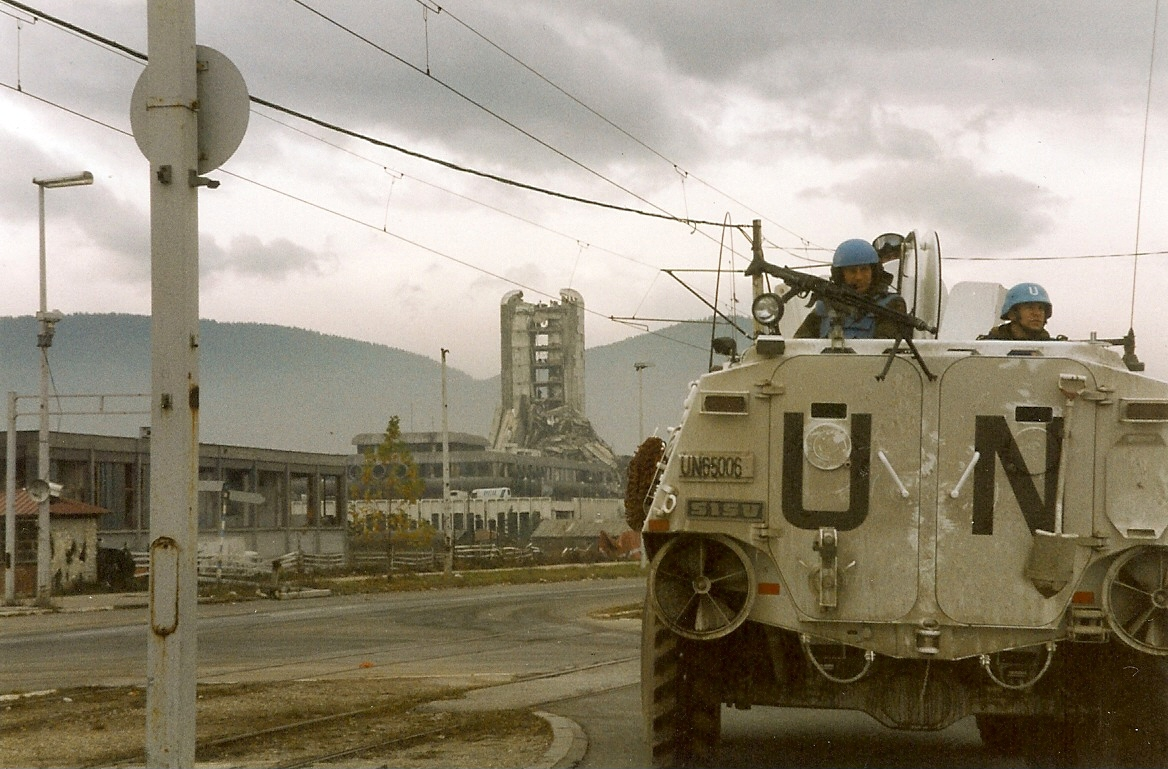
UNPROFOR troops on their way up "Sniper Alley" in Sarajevo during the Bosnian War

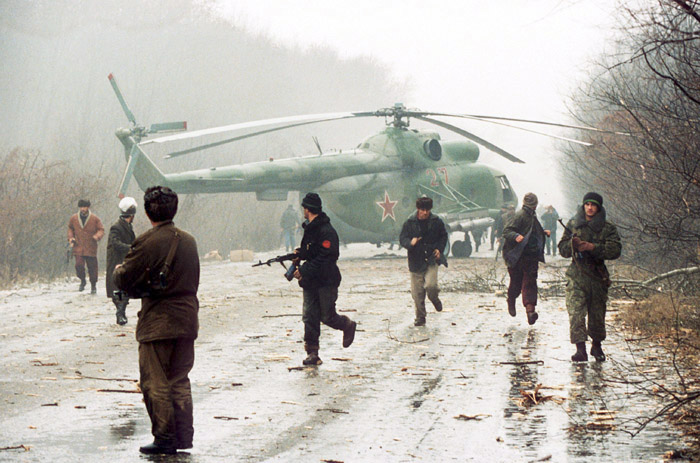
A Russian helicopter downed by Chechen militants, during the First Chechen War

- 1903: Ilinden–Preobrazhenie Uprising
- 1904–1908: Macedonian Struggle
- 1904–1905: Russo-Japanese War
- 1905: Łódź insurrection
- 1905: Revolution of 1905
- 1906–1908: Theriso revolt
- 1907: 1907 Romanian Peasants' Revolt
- 1910: Albanian Revolt of 1910
- 1910: 5 October 1910 revolution
- 1911: Albanian Revolt of 1911
- 1911–1912: Italo-Turkish War
- 1912: Albanian Revolt of 1912
- 1912: Royalist attack on Chaves
- 1912–1913: Balkan Wars
  - 1912–1913: First Balkan War
  - 1913: Tikveš Uprising
  - 1913: Second Balkan War
- 1913: Ohrid–Debar Uprising
- 1914: Peasant Revolt in Albania
- 1914–1918: World War I
  - 1914: Caucasus Campaign
  - 1916: Noemvriana
  - 1917: Toplica Uprising
  - 1918: Judenburg mutiny
  - 1918: Cattaro Mutiny
  - 1918: Aster Revolution
  - 1918: Radomir Rebellion
  - 1918: Finnish Civil War
- 1916: Easter Rising
- 1917: Russian Revolution
  - 1917: February Revolution
  - 1917: July Days
  - 1917: Polubotkivtsi uprising
  - 1917: Kornilov affair
  - 1917: October Revolution
    - 1917: Junker mutiny
  - 1917: Kerensky–Krasnov uprising
- 1917–1921: Russian Civil War
  - 1917–1918: Red Army invasion of Georgia
  - 1917–1921: Ukrainian War of Independence
    - 1917–1921: Ukrainian–Soviet War
    - 1918–1919: Polish–Ukrainian War
  - 1918–1924: Left-wing uprisings against the Bolsheviks
    - 1918: Left SR uprising
    - 1921: Kronstadt rebellion
  - 1918–1922: Heimosodat
    - 1918: Viena expedition
    - 1918: Aunus expedition
    - 1918–1920: Petsamo expeditions
    - 1918–1920: National revolt of Ingrian Finns
    - 1921–1922: East Karelian Uprising
  - 1918–1920: Estonian War of Independence
  - 1918–1925: Allied intervention in the Russian Civil War
    - 1918–1920: North Russia Intervention
    - 1918–1922: Siberian Intervention
  - 1918: Georgian–Armenian War
  - 1918–1920: Georgian–Ossetian conflict (1918–20)
  - 1918–1919: Georgian-Russian conflict over Sochi
  - 1918–1920: Armenian–Azerbaijani War
  - 1918–1920: Latvian War of Independence
  - 1918–1920: Lithuanian Wars of Independence
    - 1918–1919: Lithuanian–Soviet War
    - 1919: Lithuanian War of Independence (War against the Bermontians)
    - 1920: Polish–Lithuanian War
  - 1919–1921: Polish–Soviet War
  - 1921: Georgian–Russian War
    - 1921 Svaneti uprising of 1921
    - 1921 Kakhet-Khevsureti rebellion
  - 1924: Georgian Uprising against Soviet Union
- 1919–1920: Revolutions and interventions in Hungary (1918–20)
  - 1918–1919: Hungarian–Romanian War
  - 1918–1919: Hungarian–Czechoslovak War
  - 1918: Yugoslav occupation of Međimurje
  - 1919: Hutsul Uprising
- 1919: Monarchy of the North uprising
- 1919: Sejny Uprising
- 1919: Khotyn Uprising
- 1918–1919: Austro-Slovene conflict in Carinthia
- 1918–1958: Polish–Czechoslovak border conflicts
  - 1919: Polish-Czech war for Teschen Silesia
- 1918–1919: German Revolution
- 1918–1919: Greater Poland Uprising
- 1919–1922: Greco-Turkish War
- 1918–1921: Franco-Turkish War
- 1920: Armenian-Turkish War
- 1919: Christmas Uprising
- 1919–1920: Unrest in Split
- 1919–1921: Silesian Uprisings
  - 1919: First Silesian Uprising
  - 1920: Second Silesian Uprising
  - 1921: Third Silesian Uprising
- 1919–1922: Irish War of Independence
- 1920: Husino rebellion
- 1920: Vlora War
- 1920: Kapp Putsch
- 1920: Ruhr Uprising
- 1920: Slutsk Defence Action
- 1920–1924: Biennio Rosso
- 1921: Uprising in West Hungary
- 1921: February Uprising
- 1921: Charles IV of Hungary's attempts to retake the throne
- 1922–1923: Irish Civil War
- 1923: Corfu incident
- 1923: September Uprising
- 1923: Klaipėda Revolt
- 1923: Leonardopoulos–Gargalidis coup d'état attempt
- 1924: 1924 Estonian coup d'état attempt
- 1924: August Uprising
- 1925: Incident at Petrich
- 1932: Mäntsälä rebellion
- 1933: Casas Viejas incident
- 1933: Anarchist uprising in Spain
- 1934: Asturian miners' strike
- 1934: Austrian Civil War
- 1934: July Putsch
- 1935: Greek coup d'état attempt
- 1936–1953: Turkish Straits crisis
- 1936–1939: Spanish Civil War
- 1938: 1938 Greek coup d'état attempt
- 1939: German occupation of Czechoslovakia
- 1939: Hungarian invasion of Carpatho-Ukraine
- 1939: Slovak-Hungarian War
- 1939: Italian invasion of Albania
- 1939–1965: Spanish Maquis
- 1939–1940: S-Plan
- 1939–1945: World War II
  - 1939: Nazi German invasion of Poland
  - 1939: Soviet invasion of Poland
  - 1939–1940: Winter War(Soviet invasion of Finland)
  - 1940: Phoney War
  - 1940: Operation Weserübung
  - 1940: Norwegian campaign
  - 1940: Occupation of Iceland
  - 1940: Invasion of Luxembourg
  - 1940: Battle of the Netherlands
  - 1940: Battle of Belgium
  - 1940: Battle of France
  - 1940: Italian invasion of France
  - 1940: Soviet invasion of the Baltic States
  - 1940: Soviet occupation of Bessarabia and Northern Bukovina
  - 1940: Battle of Britain
  - 1940–1941: Greco-Italian War
  - 1941–1945: Soviet–German War
  - 1941–1945: Yugoslav anti-fascist resistance movement
  - 1941–1944: Continuation War
  - 1941: Uprising in Montenegro
  - 1942: Case Blue
  - 1942–1944: Northern Campaign
  - 1942–1956: Ukrainian Insurgent Army
  - 1943: Italian Campaign
  - 1944: Operation Market Garden
  - 1944: Warsaw Uprising
  - 1944: Western Allied invasion of Germany
  - 1944–1945: Lapland War
  - 1944–1945: Slovak National Uprising
  - 1944–1945: Liberation of France
  - 1944–1945: Battle of the Bulge
  - 1945: Second Battle of the Alps
  - 1945: Battle of Berlin
- 1944–1953: Anti-communist resistance in Poland (1944–1953)
- 1944–1960: Anti-Soviet resistance by the Ukrainian Insurgent Army
- 1944–1956: Goryani movement
- 1944–1956: Guerrilla war in the Baltic states
  - 1944–1953: Lithuanian partisans
  - 1944–1953: Estonian partisans
- 1945–1950: Crusader insurgency
- 1946–1949: Greek Civil War
- 1946: Corfu Channel incident
- 1947–1962: Romanian anti-communist resistance movement
- 1948: 1948 Czechoslovak coup d'état
- 1948–1949: Berlin Blockade
- 1948–1954: Albanian–Yugoslav border conflict (1948–1954)
- 1948: Zhapokikë Uprising
- 1949–1955: Operation Jungle
- 1949–1956: Operation Valuable
- 1950: Cazin rebellion
- 1953: Air battle over Merklín
- 1953: 1953 Plzeň uprising
- 1953: Norilsk uprising
- 1953: East German uprising of 1953
- 1953: Vorkuta uprising
- 1955–1959: Cyprus Emergency
- 1956: Poznań 1956 protests
- 1956: Hungarian Revolution of 1956
- 1956–1962: Operation Harvest
- 1957: Fatti di Rovereta
- 1957: 1957 United States Air Force incursion into Albanian airspace
- 1958–1961: First Cod War
- 1958: May 1958 crisis
- 1959–1974: Cypriot intercommunal violence
- 1959–2011: Basque conflict
- 1961: Berlin Crisis of 1961
- 1967: 1967 Greek coup d'état
- 1967: King Constantine's counter-coup attempt
- 1968: Warsaw Pact invasion of Czechoslovakia
- 1968–1998: The Troubles
- 1968–1988: Years of Lead (Italy)
- 1972–1973: Second Cod War
- 1973: 1973 Greek coup d'état
- 1974–1977: First 'Ndrangheta war
- 1974: Turkish invasion of Cyprus
- 1974: Carnation Revolution
- 1975: Aleria standoff
- 1975: Hot Summer of 1975
- 1975–1976: Third Cod War
- 1976–present: Corsican conflict
- 1977: German Autumn
- 1978: Egyptian raid on Larnaca International Airport
- 1980: Iranian Embassy siege
- 1981: 1981 Spanish coup d'état attempt
- 1981–1984: Second Mafia War
- 1981–1983: Martial law in Poland
- 1985: Crisis of Sigonella
- 1985–1991: Second 'Ndrangheta war
- 1986: Evros River incident
- 1988–present: Nagorno-Karabakh conflict
  - 1988–1994: First Nagorno-Karabakh War
- 1989–present: Abkhazia conflict
  - 1992–1993: War in Abkhazia (1992–1993)
  - 1998: War in Abkhazia (1998)
- 1989–1995: Gagauzia conflict
- 1989–present: Georgian–Ossetian conflict
  - 1991–1992: South Ossetia war (1991–1992)
- 1989: Romanian Revolution
- 1990: Leopoldov prison uprising
- 1990: Log Revolution
- 1990–1991: Soviet OMON assaults on Lithuanian border posts
- 1990–present: Transnistria conflict
  - 1990–1992: Transnistria War
- 1991: January Events (Lithuania)
- 1991: The Barricades
- 1991–1995: Croatian War of Independence
- 1991: Ten-Day War
- 1991–1993: Georgian Civil War
- 1991: 1991 Soviet coup attempt
- 1992: Submarine incident off Kildin Island
- 1992: East Prigorodny Conflict
- 1992–1995: Bosnian War
  - 1992: 1992 Yugoslav campaign in Bosnia
  - 1992–1994: Croat–Bosniak War
  - 1993–1995: Intra-Bosnian Muslim War
- 1993: Submarine incident off Kola Peninsula
- 1993: 1993 Cherbourg incident
- 1993: 1993 Russian constitutional crisis
- 1994–1997: Nordic Biker War
- 1994: Battle of Grozny (November 1994)
- 1994–1996: First Chechen War
- 1995: Insurgency in Kosovo (1995–1998)
- 1996: Imia/Kardak crisis
- 1997–2017: Insurgency in Kabardino-Balkaria and Karachay-Cherkessia
- 1997: 1997 Albanian civil unrest
- 1998–present: Dissident Irish Republican campaign
- 1998–1999: Kosovo War
  - 1999: NATO airstrikes against Yugoslavia
  - 1999–2001: Insurgency in the Preševo Valley
  - 1999: Incident at Pristina airport
  - 1999: Prizren incident (1999)
- 1999–2009: Second Chechen War
- 1999: War in Dagestan (1999)
- 2000: 2000 unrest in Kosovo

== 21st century ==
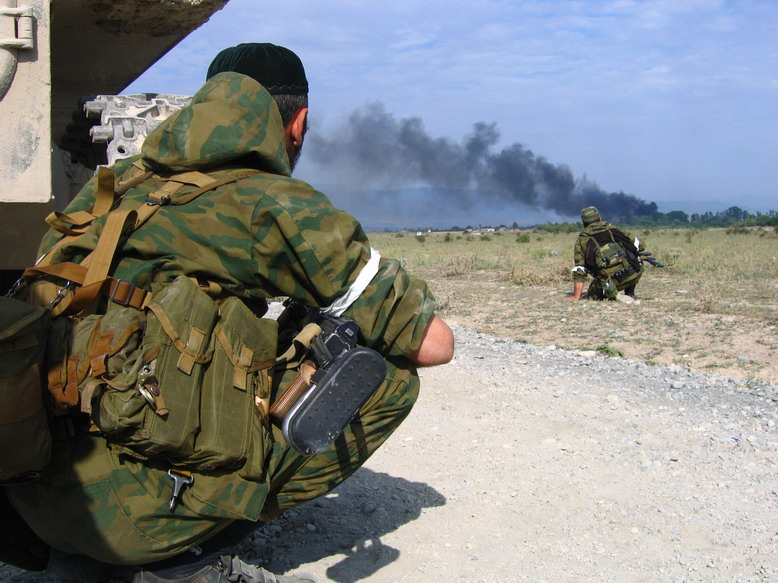
The Russian army's Vostok Battalion in South Ossetia during the Russo-Georgian War.

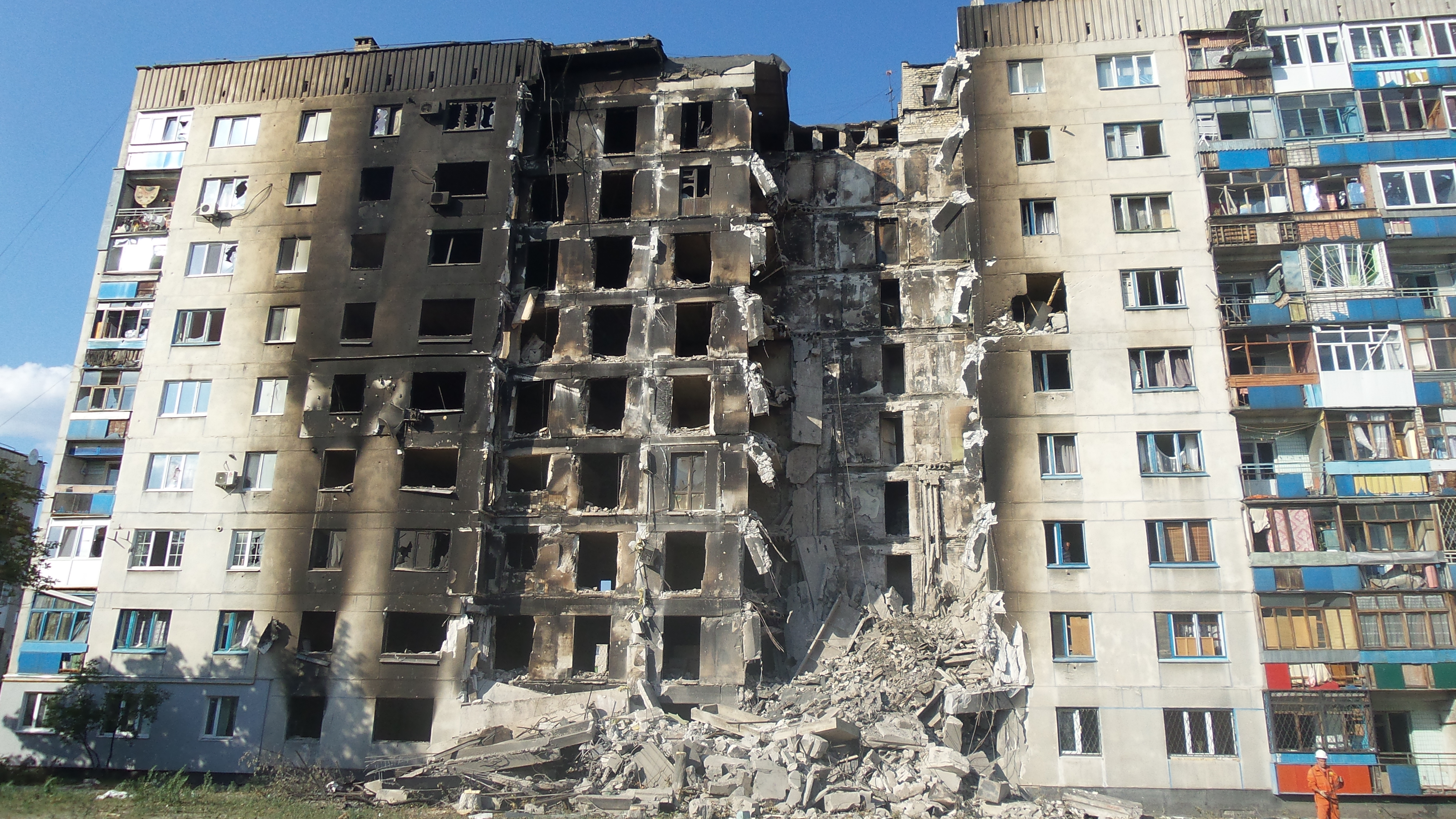
Damaged building during the Russo-Ukrainian War, in Lysychansk, Ukraine on 4 August 2014.

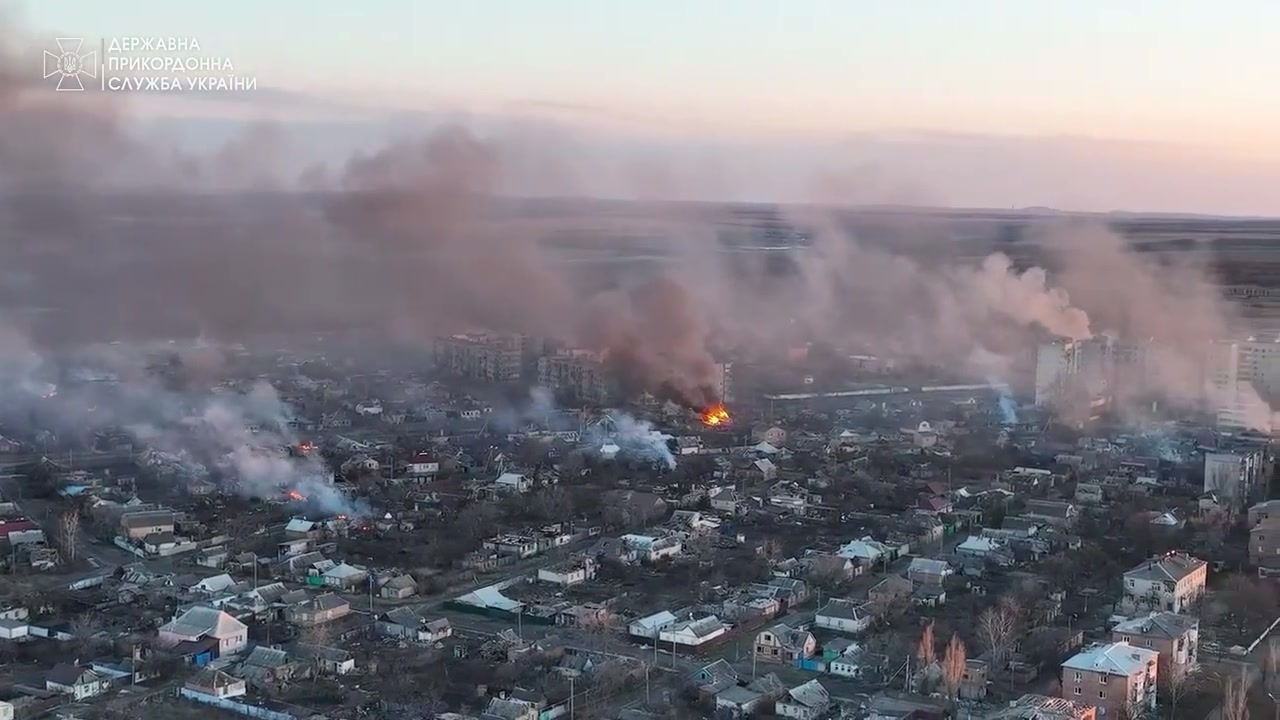
Battle of Bakhmut, 2023

- 2001: 2001 insurgency in Macedonia
- 2001–2003: Pankisi Gorge crisis
- 2001–present: Abkhazia conflict
  - 2001: 2001 Kodori crisis
  - 2006: 2006 Kodori crisis
  - 2007: Bokhundjara incident
- 2002–2013: Crisis in the Preševo Valley
- 2003: 2003 Tuzla Island conflict
- 2003–2004: 2004 Adjara crisis
- 2004–present: Georgian–Ossetian conflict
  - 2004: 2004 South Ossetian clashes
- 2007–2015: Insurgency in Ingushetia
- 2007: Operation Mountain Storm
- 2008: Russo-Georgian War
- 2008–2024: Nagorno-Karabakh conflict
  - 2008: 2008 Mardakert clashes
  - 2010: 2010 Nagorno-Karabakh clashes
  - 2010: 2010 Mardakert clashes
  - 2012: 2012 Armenian–Azerbaijani border clashes
  - 2014: 2014 Armenian–Azerbaijani clashes
  - 2016: 2016 Nagorno-Karabakh conflict
  - 2018: 2018 Armenian–Azerbaijani clashes
  - 2020: July 2020 Armenian–Azerbaijani clashes
  - 2020: Second Nagorno-Karabakh War
  - 2021–2024: Armenian-Azerbaijani border clashes
    - 2022: September 2022 Armenia–Azerbaijan clashes
  - 2023: 2023 Azerbaijani offensive in Nagorno-Karabakh
- 2009–2017: Insurgency in the North Caucasus
- 2010: 2010 Blace bunker raid
- 2010: Raduša shootout
- 2011–2013: North Kosovar crisis
- 2012: Lopota incident
- 2013–2014: Euromaidan
  - 2014: Revolution of Dignity
- 2014: 2014 pro-Russian unrest in Ukraine
- 2014–present: Russo-Ukrainian War
  - 2014: Invasion and occupation of Crimea by Russia
  - 2014–2022: War in Donbas
  - 2021–2022: Prelude to the Russian invasion of Ukraine
  - 2022–present: Russian invasion of Ukraine
    - 2022–present: Belarusian and Russian partisan movement (2022–present)
    - 2023: Wagner Group rebellion
- 2015: Gošince attack
- 2015: 2015 Kumanovo clashes
- 2017: 2017 Isani flat siege
- 2017–present: Islamic State insurgency in the North Caucasus
- 2022–present: North Kosovo crisis (2022–2026)
- 2026–present: 2026 Iran war
  - 2026: 2026 strikes on Akrotiri and Dhekelia
  - 2026: 2026 Iranian strike on Azerbaijan

=== Ongoing conflicts ===
Ongoing conflicts in Europe
Conflict	Includes	Date started	Duration	Casualties
Russo-Ukrainian War	2014 pro-Russian unrest in Ukraine; Annexation of Crimea by the Russian Federation; War in Donbas; Prelude to the Russian invasion of Ukraine; Russian invasion of Ukraine; Belarusian and Russian partisan movement (2022–present); Violations of non-combatant airspace during the Russo-Ukrainian war (2022–present); 2025 Russian drone incursion into Poland; Øresund drone incident	20 Feb 2014	12 years, 8 months, 3 weeks and 6 days	250,000+ to 285,000 killed, 300,000 to 400,000 wounded, as of February, 2023
2026 Iran War	• drone strikes on Akrotiri and Dhekelia 1st-4th March • Iranian drone strikes on Azerbajian	28 February 2026	8 months, 2 weeks and 5 days	As of 16 March 2026 in Europe: 4 wounded (civilian) 1 French soldier killed (not in Europe)

== See also ==
- Outline of war § History of war – a complete global listing
- List of conflicts in North America
- List of conflicts in Central America
- List of conflicts in South America
- List of conflicts in Africa
- List of conflicts in Asia
- List of conflicts in the Near East
- List of conflicts in the Middle East
- List of German–Swedish wars
- List of wars involving Rome
- List of wars involving England and France
- List of wars in Great Britain
- List of wars in Ireland
- List of wars involving Bulgaria
- List of wars of succession in Europe
- List of countries in Europe by military expenditures
