= Timeline of Ioannina =

The following is a timeline of the history of the city of Ioannina, Greece.

== 9th century ==
- 879 – First appearance of the name Ioannina in the acts of the Fourth Council of Constantinople.

== 11th century ==
- 1020 – Emperor Basil II subordinated the local bishopric to the Archbishopric of Ohrid.
- 1082 – Normans under the leadership of Bohemond of Taranto occupied Ioannina.Bohemond buttressed the already existing fortifications and erected a second fortified citadel

== 12th century ==
- 1198 – the city is listed as part of its own province (provincia Joanninorum or Joaninon).

== 13th century ==
- 1204 – Ioannina became part of the new state of Epirus, founded by Michael I Komnenos Doukas.
  - Michael gathered refugees who had fled Constantinople and other parts of the Empire that fell to the crusaders of the Fourth Crusade, and settled them there, transforming the city into a fortress and "ark of salvation".
- 1205-15 – Michael I Komnenos Doukas renovated the walls of the castle.
- 1232 – Despite frictions with local inhabitants who tried to expel the refugees, the latter were eventually successfully settled and Ioannina gained in both population and economic and political importance.
- 1259 – In the aftermath of the Battle of Pelagonia, much of Epirus was occupied by the Empire of Nicaea, and Ioannina was placed under siege. Soon, however, the Epirote ruler Michael II Komnenos Doukas, aided by his younger son John I Doukas, managed to recover their capital of Arta and relieve Ioannina, evicting the Nicaeans from Epirus.
- 1291/92 – Ioannina were unsuccefully besieged by byzantine troops.

== 14th century ==
- 1318 – Assassination of the last native ruler, Thomas I Komnenos Doukas by his nephew Nicholas Orsini. The city refused to accept the latter and turned to the Byzantines for assistance. On this occasion, Emperor Andronikos II Palaiologos elevated the city to a metropolitan bishopric.
- 1319 – A chrysobull conceding wide-ranging autonomy and various privileges and exemptions on its inhabitants. A Jewish community is also attested in the city.
- 1321 – A chrysobull conceding various privileges.
- 1330 – John II Orsini was accepted as governor and vassal to the emperor, renewing the privileges.
- 1337/38 – In the Epirote revolt against Byzantine rule, the city remained loyal to Emperor Andronikos III Palaiologos.
- 1348 – Epirus conquested by serbs.Ioannina kept their privileges.
- 1366 – The citizens of Ioannina, the last major fortress to remain under Simeon Uroš's control, sent him a petition to appoint a governor who could protect them from the raids of Albanian nobles.
- 1367
  - – Thomas Preljubović appointed as the new overlord of Ioannina.
  - – Pjetër Losha together with his son, Gjin, launched an invasion into Thomas II Preljubović's despotate. During their campaign, Pjetër laid a three-year siege on the Ioannina.
- 1370 – The siege and thus the war ended with a ceasefire, in which Thomas's daughter Irina, was forced to marry Gjin, son of Pjetër Losha.
- 1374/75 – Shpata quickly invaded Thomas's realm. Thomas's forces met Shpata's army near Arta, where Shpata decisively defeated the army of Thomas. Thomas then withdrew and barricaded himself in his capital of Ioannina. Not soon after that, Shpata laid siege to Ioannina and ravaged the country-side. The siege only ended when Thomas brought peace by betrothening his sister Helena to Gjon Bua Shpata the following year.
- 1377 – Malakasioi attacked Ioannina.After the failed siege of 1377, the chieftain Gjin Phrates was dragged in triumph through the streets of Ioannina and the other captives were sold into slavery. Despite Thomas' victory, the Albanians managed to get away with much plunder.
- 1379
  - – Malakasioi attacked Ioannina.in yet another unsuccessful siege the Malakasioi met a well organized resistance by the outnumbered citizens of Ioannina who finally succeeded to defeat the invaders. Two hundred Albanian besiegers who had entered the castle area surrendered to Thomas, who badly mistreated his prisoners. Albanians were sold into slavery, while a group of Bulgarians and Vlachs who were captured after the siege were mutilated.
  - – His actions led Gjin Bua Shpata to besiege the city and to devastate the surrounding fields and vineyards in March.As a response during the siege Thomas hung prisoners from the walls and threw mutilated body parts of his prisoners from the castle walls.
  - – In May, Gjin Bua Shpata devastated the countryside of Ioannina.The Chronicle of Ioannina attributes the victory of the defenders to the people of Ioannina and Archangel Michael; the city's protector saint, with Thomas receiving no credit by its author.
- 1380 – Thomas made an offensive with the help of Turks reaching up to the upper Kalamas River, where however, the Albanians, in particular, the tribe of Mazaraki held their defensive position and defeated again Thomas.
- 1384 – On December 23, Thomas was assassinated in his bed by his own bodyguards.His assassination happened at dawn, five hours in the morning when he was stabbed to death by his guards Nikephorakes, Rainakes, Artabastos and Anton the Frank, according to the Chronicle of Ioannina. Upon his death, the population of Ioannina gathered in the cathedral where the basilissa Maria Angelina was acclaimed their despoina. Her brother John Uroš Doukas Palaiologos was invited to come and advise her in governance. Thomas' collaborators were punished and the protovestiarios, Michael Apsaras, was imprisoned and exiled.
- 1385
  - – In February, Esau de' Buondelmonti married Maria Angelina Doukaina Palaiologina and became ruler of Ioannina.
  - – Gjin Bua Shpata attacked Ioannina but was unsuccessful in cracking the defense set up by Esau de' Buondelmonti.The two made peace but soon returned to the conflict.
- 1386 – Esau gained Ottoman military help.
- 1389 – Ioannina was besieged by Gjin Bua Shpata, and only with the aid of an Ottoman army was Esau able to repel the Albanians.
- 1396 – In January Esau married Shpata's only daughter, Irene. The marriage was part of a deal which the archons of Ioannina enforced on Esau in order to make peace with the Albanians.

== 15th century ==
- 1411 – Following Esau's death, the Ioannites invited the Count palatine of Cephalonia and Zakynthos, Carlo I Tocco, as their new ruler.
- 1429 – Carlo I Tocco death.
- 1430 – On 9 October, the city surrendered after the Ottoman commander, Sinan Pasha, promised to spare the city and respect its autonomy.

== 16th century ==
- 1564 – The first Ottoman tax registers for the city records 50 Muslim households and 1,250 Christian ones.
- 1579 – The Ottoman tax registers records mentions Jews.

== 17th century ==
- 1611 – Peasant revolt led by Dionysius the Philosopher, the Metropolitan of Larissa.
- 1618 – Religious complex of Aslan Pasha was founded.
- 1635 – Abolition of the right of possession of feudal landlords of the Christians. Many families are forced to convert to Islam in order to keep their property.
- 1647 – The Epiphaniou School was founded by a Greek merchant of Ioannite origin resident in Venice, Epiphaneios Igoumenos.
- 1670 – Evliya Çelebi mentions the presence of 18 Muslims quarters, 14 Christians, 4 Jewish and 1 Gypsy and describes impressive buildings. He estimated the population at 4,000 hearths.
- 1676 – The Gioumeios School was founded by a benefaction from another wealthy Ioannite Greek from Venice, Emmanuel Goumas.

== 18th century ==
- 1725 – The Gioumeios School was renamed Balaneios by its rector, Balanos Vasilopoulos.
- 1742 – Maroutsaia School was founded by Maroutses family.
- 1788 – The city became the center of the territory ruled by Ali Pasha.
- 1797 – Maroutsaia School suffered after the fall of Venice and closed.it reopened but with a new administration and name, Kaplaneios, after Zois and Manthos Kaplanis who founded this new school.

== 19th century ==
- 1815 – Restoration works for the castle started.
- 1820 – Ioannina was besieged by Turkish troops.
  - A great part of Ioannina was destroyed. The Kaplaneios was burned down along with most of the rest of the city after the entry of the Sultan's armies.The Balaneios finally stopped operation. The school's library, which hosted several manuscripts and epigrams, was also burned following the capture of Ioannina by the troops the Sultan had sent against Ali Pasha.
- 1822 – Ali Pasha was assassinated in the monastery of St Panteleimon on the island of the lake.
- 1828 – The Zosimaia was the first significant educational foundation established after the outbreak of the Greek War of Independence.
- 1828 – The existing synagogue was built and is known as the Old Synagogue.
- 1868 – The official newspaper, Vilayet, was bilingual in Turkish and Greek.
- 1869 – A great part of Ioannina was destroyed by fire.

== 20th century ==
- 1906 – Jews emigrated to New York, founding a congregation and the Kehila Kedosha Janina synagogue in 1927.
- 1913 –
  - Ioannina was incorporated into the Greek state on 21 February.
  - Population:16,804
- 1920 – Population:20,765
- 1923 – After the Asia Minor Catastrophe in 1922 and the population exchange between Greece and Turkey, Greek refugees settled in Ioannina. Turco-yanniotes left the city, as well.
- 1928 – Population:20,485
- 1940 –
  - During World War II the capture of the city became one of the major objectives of the Italian Army.
  - Population:21,887
- 1941 – In April Ioannina was intensively bombed by the German forces.
- 1943 – On 3 October, the German army murdered in reprisal nearly 100 people in the village of Lingiades, 13 kilometres distant from Ioaninna, in what is known as the Lingiades massacre.
- 1944
  - – 1,870 Jews were deported by the Nazis to concentration camps on 25 March, during the final months of German occupation. Almost all of the people deported were murdered on or shortly after 11 April 1944, when the train carrying them reached Auschwitz-Birkenau. Only 181 Ioannina Jews are known to have survived the war, including 112 who survived Auschwitz and 69 who fled to join the resistance leader Napoleon Zervas and the National Republican Greek League (EDES). Approximately 164 of these survivors eventually returned to Ioannina.
  - – In October Ioannina was liberated by Alekos Papadopoulos and the National Republican Greek League (EDES).
  - – On 23 December, during Dekemvriana, city was occupied by ELAS forces under Stefanos Sarafis and Aris Velouchiotis after fighting between the two organizations.
- 1951 – Population:32,315
- 1961 – Population:34,997
- 1964 – The University of Ioannina was founded as a charter of the Aristotle University of Thessaloniki.
- 1970 – The University of Ioannina became an independent university.
- 1971 – Population:40,130
- 1981 – Population:44,829
- 1991 – Population:56,699
- 1994 – On 29 March, an informal meeting of EU foreign ministers hosted. The Ioannina compromise took its name from this meeting.

== 21st century ==
- 2001 – Population: 67,384
- 2011 – Population: 65,574 town, 80,371 municipal unit, 112,486 municipality
- 2019 – Independent candidate Moses Elisaf, a 65-year-old doctor, was elected mayor of the city, the first Jewish elected mayor in Greece.
- 2021 – Population: 64,896 town, 81,627 municipal unit, 113,978 municipality

== Bibliography ==
- Soustal, Peter; Koder, Johannes (1981). Tabula Imperii Byzantini, Band 3: Nikopolis und Kephallēnia (in German). Vienna: Verlag der Österreichischen Akademie der Wissenschaften. ISBN 978-3-7001-0399-8.
- Nicol, Donald M. (1984). The Despotate of Epiros, 1267–1479: A Contribution to the History of Greece in the Middle Ages. Cambridge: Cambridge University Press. ISBN 978-0-521-13089-9.
- Anastassiadou, Meropi (2002). "Yanya". In Bearman, P. J.; Bianquis, Th.; Bosworth, C. E.; van Donzel, E. & Heinrichs, W. P. (eds.). The Encyclopaedia of Islam, Second Edition. Volume XI: W–Z. Leiden: E. J. Brill. pp. 282–283. ISBN 978-90-04-12756-2.
- Fine, John Van Antwerp (1994). The Late Medieval Balkans: A Critical Survey from the Late Twelfth Century to the Ottoman Conquest. University of Michigan Press. ISBN 9780472082605. OCLC 7378150671.
- Hammond, Nicholas Geoffrey Lemprière (1976). Migrations and invasions in Greece and adjacent areas. Noyes Press. ISBN 978-0-8155-5047-1. OCLC 2331298.
- Karamperidē, Argyrō (2009). Papadopoulou, Varvara (ed.). Iōannina apo tēn byzantinē kastropoliteia stēn othōmanikē megalupolē [Ioannina : from the byzantine castle to the ottoman city] (in Greek). Iōannina. pp. 1–31. ISBN 978-960-98933-12. OCLC 1073768257.
- Nicol, Donald MacGillivray (1976). "Refugees, Mixed Population and Local Patriotism in Epiros and Western Macedonia after the Fourth Crusade". XVe Congrès international d'études byzantines (Athènes, 1976), Rapports et corapports I. Athens.
- Osswald, Brendan (2011). L'Epire du treizième au quinzième siècle : autonomie et hétérogénéité d'une région balkanique (Thesis). Université Toulouse le Mirail - Toulouse II.
- Sansaridou-Hendrickx, Thekla (2017). "The Albanians in the Chronicle(s) of Ioannina: An Anthropological Approach". Acta Patristica et Byzantina. 21 (2): 287–306. doi:10.1080/10226486.2010.11879131. S2CID 163742869.
- Sansaridou-Hendrickx, Thekla (2010). "The Albanians in the Chronicle(s) of Ioannina: An Anthropological Approach". Acta Patristica et Byzantina. 21 (2): 287–306. doi:10.1080/10226486.2010.11879131. S2CID 163742869.
- Sansaridou-Hendrickx, Thekla (2011). "Maria Angelina Palaiologina: Abused Wife or Husband-Slayer?". Journal of Early Christian History. 1 (1): 131–142. doi:10.1080/2222582X.2011.11877234. ISSN 2222-582X.
- Sakellariou, M. V. (1997). Epirus, 4000 years of Greek history and civilization. Athens: Ekdotike Athenon. ISBN 978-960-213-371-2.
