= Albanian-Epirote War (1381–1384) =

Albanian-Epirote War Lufta Shqiptaro-Epirote
Date	1381–1384
Location	Epirus, modern Greece
Result	Epirote victory
Territorial changes	Thomas Preljubović took control over Velas, Boursina, Dragomi, Krezounista, Vagenetia, Dryinopolis and most of the land that was previously under the control of the Malakasioi tribe; Ottoman forces capture the fortress of Revnikon

Belligerents
Despotate of Arta	Despotate of Epirus; Ottoman Empire

Commanders and leaders
Gjin Bua Shpata	Thomas II Preljubović X Shahin Pasha

Units involved
Bua (tribe); Malakasioi tribe Mazaraki tribe	Army of Ioannina; Serbian army Janissaries

Strength
Unknown	Unknown

Casualties and losses
Unknown	Unknown

The Albanian-Epirote War of 1381–84 was waged between the Despotate of Arta, led by Gjin Bua Shpata, and the Despotate of Epirus, led by Thomas II Preljubović. During the war, Thomas would be given the nickname "Albanian-slayer", due to the cruelty he displayed towards Albanian prisoners.

== Prelude ==
In 1381, Thomas, after having successfully repulsed repeated Albanian attacks, passed to the offensive. He sought assistance first from his Frankish neighbors and then turned to the Ottomans for support. The Ottomans promptly responded by dispatching an auxiliary force to aid him. In return for their help in his fight against Arta, he allowed the Ottomans to seize Dryinoupolis.

== War ==
In 1381, Thomas II Preljubović, accompanied by Ottoman auxiliary forces, launched an invasion of the Despotate of Arta. He managed to expand his control in Dryinopolis, Velas, Boursina, Krezounista, Dragomi and Vagenetia and most of the land previously under the control of the Malakasioi tribe. As such the Albanian pressure against Ioannina seized. The Albanians, in particular the Mazreku of the Kalamas area, held firm against him.

On 5 May of 1382 the Ottoman commander, Shahin Pasha, returned and captured the fortress of Revnikon, not far to the south-west of Konitsa. Thomas was then able to enforce the submission of the Zenevesaioi and the lands of the Malakassaioi up as far as Katounai.

Meanwhile Gjin Boua Spata, perhaps being afraid that Thomas’s Ottoman allies might be turned loose on his own Despotate advanced to a place called Aroula, south of Ioannina and from there he sent forward his Italian son-in-law, Marchesano, as his ambassador and finally a marriage alliance was to be arranged. Gjin Spata was to be offered the hand in marriage of Thomas’s sister Helena, thus securing a lasting peace between the Despotates of Arta and Ioannina.

== Sources ==
- Nicol, Donald MacGillivray (1984). The Despotate of Epiros, 1267-1479: A Contribution to the History of Greece in the Middle Ages. Cambridge University Press. ISBN 978-0-521-26190-6.
- Nicol, Donald MacGillivray (1997). "Late Byzantine Period (1204–1479)". Epirus, 4000 Years of Greek History and Civilization. Ekdotike Athenon: 198–237. ISBN 9789602133712.
- Sansaridou-Hendrickx, Thekla (2010). "The Albanians in the Chronicle(s) of Ioannina: An Anthropological Approach". Acta Patristica et Byzantina. 21 (2): 287–306. doi:10.1080/10226486.2010.11879131. ISSN 1022-6486. S2CID 163742869.
