= Battle of Achelous (1359) =

Medieval battle in modern-day Greece

Battle of Achelous Beteja e Akelout
- The Achelous river within modern-day Greece
Date	Late spring or early summer of 1358 or 1359
Location	Near Achelous river, Aetolia, modern Greece
Result	Albanian victory
Territorial changes	Re-establishment of Despotate of Arta; Albanians take control over Epirus, except Ioannina

Belligerents
Albanian tribesmen	Despotate of Epirus: Turkish Mercenaries

Commanders and leaders
Karl Thopia	Nikephoros II Orsini †

Strength
Unknown	Unknown

Casualties and losses
Unknown	Heavy

The Battle of Achelous (Albanian: Beteja e Akelout) (also Battle of Acheloos) took place in 1358 or 1359 near the river Achelous in Aetolia, modern Greece, between the forces of the Despotate of Epirus under Nikephoros II Orsini and Albanian tribesmen under Karl Thopia. The Albanians defeated Orsini's troops and inflicted heavy casualties upon his forces, and Orsini himself was killed during the battle. Epirus was then divided amongst the Albanian clans, which resulted in the establishment of two despotates from regions previously part of the Despotate of Epirus: the Despotate of Arta and the Despotate of Angelokastron and Lepanto. Within Epirus, only the city of Ioannina remained under Greek governance and was not under the control of the Albanians.

== Background ==
The Albanians, who were already present in the strategically important triangle between Durrës, Ohrid and Corfu during the power struggles of the 13th century, were in great demand as allies and mercenaries; they increasingly expanded outside of their mountainous homes and began imposing themselves in the surrounding lowlands. The expansions of the growing Serbian Empire into northern Epirus and Macedonia also encouraged the Albanians to move further south. At the beginning of the 14th century, Albanian tribes began migrating to Thessaly, where they lived primarily as autonomous nomads who controlled the mountainous parts of the region. The main tribes in this region were the Mazaraki, the Bua and the Malakasioi - all three would later be present in Epirus. After 1318, the Albanian tribes began to invade and ravage the countryside of Thessaly instead of continuing their peaceful migrations, forcing the Greek and Catalan authorities to withdraw to their strongholds.

It is possible that the Albanians of Thessaly were recruited to fight in the wars involving the Catalan Company; a contemporary source of 1325 distinguished three groups of local Albanians - those who served themselves, those who sided with the Greeks, and those who sided with the Catalans. From this point onwards, every ruler of Thessaly employed Albanians into their service, and by the 1330s, Albanians were given military holdings in Phanari. The Albanians of Epirus Nova seized the fortresses of Skrapar, Timoro and Këlcyrë, but they were soon defeated by Turkish mercenaries in the Byzantine army. During this same campaign, the Despotate of Epirus was subdued and once again made part of the Byzantine Empire for a brief period of time. In 1341, with the onset of the Byzantine Civil War, the Albanians yet again launched a successful invasion of Pogoniani and Livisda. Prior to the outbreak of the civil war, Byzantine general Cantacuzene had planned to lead an army westwards to subdue the Albanians of Pogoniani and Livisda, who were regularly raiding and plundering towns as far south as Akarnania and Balagrita. The Byzantine enclave in Berat, Vlorë and Spinaritsa became isolated from the rest of the empire. In Thessaly, however, the Albanians desisted from raiding local towns, and according to Cantacuzene himself, it was due to him giving the tribes a mere warning.

=== Serbian Empire ===
Many Albanians served in Serbian Emperor Stefan Dušan's armies as mercenaries, which facilitated further migration of Albanians towards the south as Dušan began conquering parts of Greece in the 1340s.

In 1342, the Byzantine governor of Thessaly invaded southern Epirus to end the revolt of Arta, and probably employed the Albanians of Thessaly who were stationed in the Phanari region. Later that year, Thessaly submitted to Stefan Dušan, and Dušan's conquest of Epirus and Thessaly was complete by the end of 1348. Dušan appointed one of his relatives and generals - Preljub - to govern Thessaly, and he appointed Symeon Uroš to govern Epirus. Preljub had conquered Thessaly for Dušan and was given the honorary title of Caesar. Preljub struggled to subdue the Albanian and Vlach tribes of Thessaly and was forced to turn his attention towards the now Byzantine emperor Cantacuzene, who had invaded Macedonia in 1350 in an attempt to recapture the Byzantine provinces lost to the Serbian Empire and was now at Thessaly's border. Cantacuzene was repulsed by Preljub after unsuccessfully besieging Servia, and his territorial gains in Thessaly were soon recovered by the Serbs.

Stefan Dušan died in December 1355, and the Serbian Empire began to fragment apart as a number of different successor states rose in its place. The peace between Preljub and the Albanians did not last for very long, and Preljub was killed by the Albanians during a clash near Trikkala shortly after Dušan's death. The Byzantine Empire was too preoccupied to intervene after Preljub's death in an attempt to retake Epirus and Thessaly, but Nikephoros II, son of the last Despot of Epirus John II Orsini, saw the fractioning of the Serbian Empire as an opportunity to recover his father's lost territorial and titular possessions.

=== Arrival of Nikephoros II ===
Nikephoros felt no personal loyalty to the new Byzantine emperor, John V Palaiologos, and sailed to Thessaly in 1356 from his governorship of Aenos. Due to the support he received from his brother-in-law and governor of Epirus Symeon Uroš as well as locals who were both happy to rid themselves of Serbian rule and eager for help against the Albanians, Nikephoros conquered Thessaly without much difficulty. After becoming ruler of Thessaly and Akarnania, he ousted family rivals and targeted Venetian-held Leukas, capturing its ruler. Nikephoros then set his sights on Epirus, and after Symeon was expelled from the capital city of Arta, the town submitted to Nikephoros' rule. However, although Nikephoros controlled the towns of Epirus and Aetolia, the countryside was firmly under the control of the Albanians.

Nikephoros was driven to launch a campaign against the Albanians by the local Greeks who had been dispossessed of much of their territory by the Albanian tribesmen. Despite his limited success, he stirred the animosity of the Albanians against him, and any alliance between the Albanians and Symeon (the former governor of Epirus) would have been problematic. However, Nikephoros' campaign was marred by his admiral Limpidarios' betrayal, who seized Aenos for himself in Nikephoros' absence. Nikephoros' wife, Maria Cantacuzene (the daughter of former Byzantine emperor John Cantacuzene), initially fled to Constantinople, then joined her husband in Thessaly. Despite their reunion, Nikephoros, who was advised to seek a political marriage, left Maria under guard in Arta and proposed to a Serbian princess who was the sister of Stefan Dušan's widow, Helena of Bulgaria. After escaping to the Morea with her brother Manuel Cantacuzene's help, Maria's plight and Nikephoros' pursuit of a Serbian alliance angered the Albanians, leading to threats of war against him.

According to John Cantacuzene himself in his contemporary work, Nikephoros' poor treatment of his wife Maria - a Cantacuzene - angered the Albanians, who considered themselves allies of the Cantacuzenati. While Cantacuzene's work might have exaggerated the affection his family commanded from the Albanians, they reflect the profound influence of honour, family ties, and patronage in late medieval Epirus and Thessaly. The Albanians used the scandal as a pretext for rebellion, and either out of fear or a realisation of his mistake amid Albanian unrest, Nikephoros annulled the Serbian marriage plans and recalled Maria. However, Not wanting people to think that their loyalty to him depended on Maria, Nikephoros had organised an expedition to subdue the rebellious Albanians before she returned. Nikephoros wanted to crush the Albanians for daring to threaten him in the hopes of changing his policies.

== Battle ==
Nikephoros hoped to expel the Albanians from Epirus, and he hired a group of Turkish corsairs who were plundering Thessaly as mercenaries to help him against the Albanians. Nikephoros marched into the region where the Albanians had settled, and in turn, the Albanians mobilised a large force of their own.

Nikephoros attacked the Albanians, who were led by Karl Thopia, near Acheloos in Aetolia. In the ensuing battle, Nikephoros' army was destroyed by the Albanians and Nikephoros himself was killed during the fighting, resulting in an Albanian victory.

=== Date and figures ===
The exact date of the Battle of Achelous has been debated, with primary sources suggesting it occurred three years, two months, and a few days after Nikephoros' arrival in Thessaly in 1356, placing his death in 1359. However, discrepancies in historical accounts and theories by scholars like J. Voyatzidis and C. Hopf suggest alternative dates ranging from 1358 to 1359, based on interpretations of conquest timelines and the involvement of key figures. Ultimately, Hopf's interpretation, aligning with most of the evidence available, suggests the battle occurred in late spring or early summer of 1358, despite debates over the exact year. Attributions to a later year and even a different leader for the Albanians (claimed by some to be Gjin Bua Shpata and Peter Losha rather than Karl Thopia) are probably based on misunderstandings of primary sources that were referring to different events.

== Aftermath ==
Nikephoros' death left Epirus and Thessaly without a ruler, and Karl Thopia left the victory spoils to Gjin Bua Shpata and Pjetër Losha. Symeon quickly marched to Thessaly to fill the power vacuum left behind by Nikephoros' death and was welcomed and crowned by the local Greeks in Trikkala, with most of Thessaly following suit. Symeon then focused on reclaiming his former holdings in Epirus, and since most of the major towns in the region were threatened by the Albanian tribesmen, they quickly submitted to his rule. Meanwhile, Hlapen marched onto Symeon's Thessalian holdings and took Damasis, but his campaign was halted when he and Symeon organised an alliance through marriage as well as a settlement that resulted in the transfer of certain territories over to Hlapen.

The governors Symeon appointed prior to his departure from Epirus failed to control the region, and the migration of the Albanians continued in ever greater numbers. Soon, they had settled throughout Epirus and took control of most of the towns, including Arta, prompting Symeon - who was not strong enough to expel the Albanians - to try and maintain indirect control of the region by recognising important local figures as his deputies. The most powerful leaders in Epirus and Aetolia were the Albanian chieftains Gjin Bua Shpata and Pjetër Losha, who acquired most of these two regions in the mid-to-late 1350s. Both chieftains were recognised as Despots by Symeon, and Aetolia and southern Epirus were divided between them; Pjetër Losha established the Despotate of Arta around the city of Arta itself, whilst Gjin Bua Shpata established the Despotate of Angelokastron and Lepanto around Angelokastron. As such, Epirus came under Albanian rule.

Despite their firm rule over Epirus, the Albanians were not able to create a centralised state to replace the Greek or Serbian states that preceded them as a result of their tribal divisions and the regular feuds between them. There was no central authority to govern over the Albanian tribesmen, whose tribal territories were constantly changing as a result of their quarrels with other tribes. By late 1366 or 1367, only one city in the region - Ioannina - was not controlled by the Albanians, and its inhabitants requested the appointment of a governor by Symeon. Symeon appointed Thomas Preljubović, initiating a series of new conflicts between Thomas and the Albanians. The city remained under Greek governance, and as a traditional centre of Byzantine imperial ideology, Ioannina made every effort to resist the threat of the Albanians. Three foreign despots were successively appointed to govern Ioannina, all of which utilised their alliances with the Ottomans to defend the city from the Albanian tribes. The third of these despots - Carlo I Tocco - finally managed to subdue the Albanian clans and seized Arta in 1416, but he had no reason to expel them; Carlo's army consisted mostly of Albanians from the beginning of his conquests. In fact, the army of Ioannina consisted primarily of Albanians both before and during Carlo's reign. Nevertheless, Albanians were never welcomed in Ioannina during this time.
