= Mazreku (Epirus) =

The Mazreku, or alternatively, the Mazaraki, Mazarech and Masarachi, were a historical Albanian tribe in medieval Epirus and Thessaly. They appear in historical records as one of the Albanian tribes which raided and invaded Thessaly after 1318 and throughout the 14th century were active in the struggles of the Albanian Despotate of Arta against the Despotate of Epirus.

== Name and Toponomy ==
The linguists Eqrem Çabej and Martin Camaj state the Albanian name mazrek (definite form: mazreku) means 'horse breeder' and is derived from the Albanian root maz- meaning 'foal/colt' (young horse). The earlier renditions of the name Mazarak or Mazërek underwent a shift of the middle a sound to ë and the last a to e. To this root, two successive suffixes were added: -ar and -ak (or -ek). Thus, mazarek originally referred to 'a tribe engaged in the breeding of horses or foals'.

The linguist Kostas Oikonomou supports the association of the name with the tribe. He derives it from the Albanian noun mazi, -a, meaning 'ploughed field ready for sowing', combined with the suffix -(t)ar, which is used in Albanian to form nouns indicating a person engaged in a specific activity. From the form mazar, the suffix -ak was added, which in Albanian can signify an inhabitant of a place.

Toponyms connected to the Mazaraki are spread widely across Albanian-inhabited lands; the Mazaraki of Epirus are the namesake of two toponyms (both called Mazaraki) near Ioannina and near Paramythia. Additionally, the toponym Mazaraki exists elsewhere in Epirus, in the eparchy of Patras, whilst the toponym Mazarakia is present in the eparchy of Margariti; there is also a Mazarakati in Cephalonia and Mazarakianika in Attica-Boeotia. John VI Kantakouzenos's History, which was written in the second half of the 14th century, mentions that the "Albanian tribes of Mazaraki, Bua, Malakasi were named so after the names of their leaders." Albanian clans traditionally bore the name of their first leader or progenitor, but after intermarriage between different leading families, the identification of the clans became intricate.

== History ==
During the second half of the 14th century, the Mazaraki tribe, alongside the fellow Albanian Malakasi tribe, were led by Pjetër Losha, an Albanian nobleman of Epirus. Losha founded his domain, the Despotate of Arta, around the city of Arta with the help of the Mazaraki and Malakasi clans.

The Mazaraki regularly supported local Albanian leaders in their struggles against the Despotate of Epirus. In 1366, Thomas Preljubović succeeded Simeon Uroš as the ruler of Epirus. His rule marked a renewal of hostilities in the region, as from 1367 to 1370, Ioannina, the capital of Preljubović, came under constant siege by the Mazaraki and Malakasi clans under Pjetër Losha. These tribes would besiege Ioannina a second time in 1374–1375. A truce was signed when Pjetër's son Gjin was betrothed to Thomas's daughter Irina. She died in the 1375 plague that affected the region and hostilities began yet again.

Thomas Preljubović attempted to pacify the Albanians of Epirus; however, under Gjin Bua Shpata, the Albanians - particularly the Mazaraki of the Kalamas Valley - held firm against him. In 1399, the Despot of Ioannina, Esau de' Buondelmonti, gathered an army from the districts of Zagoi, Mt. Papinges, Malakasi and Mazaraki, and marched on Gjirokastër with his tribal Albanian allies. He was defeated and captured by Albanian nobleman Gjon Zenebishi, and ransomed for 10,000 gold pieces on the intervention of the Venetian governor of Corfu.

A Giorgio Masarachi is listed among the Albanians of Palazzo Adriano in Sicily, while a further nine stradiots in Italy with the surname Masarachi are documented from 1541 to 1569, and are thought to have probably hailed from the Mazaraki of Epirus. Two Mazaraki families exist in Cephalonia and Kythno of modern Greece.

The settlement of Mazërreku/Mazaraki in Epirus was the main settlement of the core group of the Mazreku tribe since its early days, and it appeared in the early Ottoman era as the seat of a kaza. In the beginning of the 16th century, the core of Margariti was founded via the military services of the Mazreku tribe, who guarded the fortress there. The conversion to Islam of the guard of Margariti must have occurred before 1571. Margariti was the administrative centre of the nahiye of Mazaraki, which was renamed to the nahiye of Margariti in 1551. The original name of the nahiye refers to the Mazreku clan who lived in the region.
