= Thomais Orsini =

- Queen consort of Epirus
- Born: Thomais Komnene Angelina Orsini c. 1330
- Died: before 1385
- Spouse: Simeon Uroš
- Issue: John Uroš; Stephen Uroš; Maria Angelina Doukaina Palaiologina
- House: Orsini
- Father: John II Orsini
- Mother: Anna Palaiologina

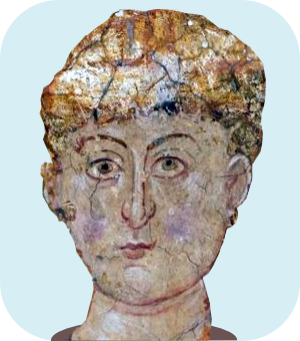
Thomais's husband: Simeon Uroš Nemanjić

Thomais Orsini (c. 1330 – before 1385) was the queen consort of the Serbian tsar and ruler of Epirus and Thessaly, Simeon Uroš Nemanjić.

== Early life ==
Born Thomais Komnene Angelina in the early 1330s, she lost her father John II Orsini in 1335, when he was poisoned, allegedly by his wife, Anna Palaiologina, a scion of the ruling Palaiologos dynasty of the Byzantine Empire. After John II's death, his wife Anna became regent of the Despotate of Epirus for Thomais' brother, Nikephoros II.

Soon, however, in 1338, the Orsini were evicted from Epirus by the Byzantine emperor Andronikos III Palaiologos, who annexed Epirus to the Byzantine Empire. Nevertheless, during the destructive Byzantine civil war that followed Andronikos III's death in 1341, most of the remaining Byzantine territories, including Epirus and Thessaly, fell to the forces of the Serbian ruler Stephen IV Dušan, who in 1346 founded the Serbian Empire. In 1348, Dušan appointed his younger half-brother, the half-Greek Simeon Uroš Palaiologos, as governor of Acarnania and the southern parts of Epirus.

== Marriage to Simeon Uroš ==
To consolidate his position with the local population, Simeon decided to marry Thomais, the descendant of the former ruling Epirote apostolic line of the Orsini family. Together they had three children: John Uroš, who succeeded as ruler of Thessaly, Stephen Uroš, governor of Pharsalos, and Maria, who married Thomas II Preljubović, who also ruled over Epirus.

Meanwhile, Thomais' deposed brother Nikephoros was living in Constantinople where he had supported John VI Kantakouzenos in the civil war against John V Palaiologos. Titled panhypersebastos, then despotes, Nikephoros married in summer 1342 Kantakouzenos' daughter Maria and was named governor of Ainos and the Hellespont between 1351 and 1355.

In 1355, Simeon rose in rebellion against Stephen Dušan, but in December of the same year, Dušan died, leaving Simeon as a credible contender for the vacant throne of the Serbian Empire, based on the Slavic tradition of brothers succeeding before sons. However, Dušan had already crowned his own son, Stephen V Uroš, as his heir. To make matters worse, in the same year, Nikephoros II overthrew the Serbian governor of Thessaly, Gregory Preljub, gained the support of the local population and soon aspired to reclaim his ancestral throne in Epirus as well. In 1356, Nikephoros entered Epirus and forced Simeon to flee from Acarnania to Kastoria, one of his strongholds in Macedonia.

Despite this setback, Simeon had himself proclaimed Tsar "of the Serbs and the Greeks" at Kastoria in the place of his young nephew, back in central Serbia. Simeon launched a campaign to take over the central Serbian homelands, but the Serbian nobility, in a council held at Skopje in 1357, resolved to support Stephen V Uroš, in accordance with Dušan's will. Success escaped Simeon on the field as well: in the summer of 1358, he advanced on Zeta but was stopped at Scutari, where his army of 5000 men was defeated by the Serbian nobility. Simeon returned to Kastoria, and never again tried to invade Serbia proper.

Although sometimes tenuous, Simeon was nevertheless able to expand his control over much of the southern parts of the Serbian Empire, making himself ruler of much of western Macedonia. After Nikephoros II's death in the Battle of Achelous in 1359 against invading Albanian clans, Simeon was quickly able to re-establish his suzerainty over the various magnates of Thessaly and Epirus, and established his court at Trikala in Thessaly, where he imitated the ceremonial of the Byzantine court.

In 1366 at the latest (or perhaps as early as 1359/60), Simeon proclaimed his eldest son John as co-ruler. Simeon died sometime between 1369 and 1371. The date of Thomais' death is unknown.
