= Knights Hospitaller invasion of Despotate of Arta =

Invasion of the Despotate of Arta by the Knights Hospitaller

Date	27 March – 23 August 1378
Location	Despotate of Arta, (Modern-day Epirus and Western Greece)
Result	Albanian victory

Belligerents
Despotate of Arta	Knights Hospitaller; Principality of Achaea; Supported by: Papal States

Commanders and leaders
Gjin Bua Shpata	Juan Fernández de Heredia (POW); Richard Overton †; Niccolò Strozzi †; Ruggiero Sansone †; Berardo Aquaviva †

Strength
Unknown	Unknown: 800 Knights (reinforcements after capturing Vonitsa)

The Knights Hospitaller invasion of the Despotate of Arta was a military campaign conducted by the Knights Hospitaller, led by Grand Master Juan Fernández de Heredia. The campaign targeted the Despotate of Arta, ruled by Gjin Bua Shpata. The invasion was sanctioned by Pope Gregory XI.

== Background ==
In 1376–1377, Gjin Bua Shpata led a campaign to capture Nafpaktos (known as Lepanto in Italian), the last Angevin stronghold in Epirus. This action angered the Knights Hospitaller, as it threatened their interests in the region.

== Invasion ==
On March 27, 1378, Grand Master Juan Fernández de Heredia, accompanied by senior Hospitallers, condottieri, and their troops, set out, crossing Acarnania. They captured Nafpaktos (Lepanto), which had been taken by Gjin Bua Shpata the previous year, and then advanced toward the town of Vonitsa, which had been besieged by Albanian forces. Upon arriving, Heredia asserted the Knights Hospitaller's claim over the territory and waited for four months, expecting reinforcements from Spain, France, and northern Italy. However, these reinforcements never arrived, likely due to the death of Pope Gregory XI, who had originally sanctioned the invasion. His successor, Pope Urban VI, also failed to dispatch the needed reinforcements. During this time, only 800 knights managed to join Heredia's forces.

On August 23, Grand Master Heredia marched toward the Despotate’s capital, Arta, with a small group of Hospitallers. However, somewhere between Arta and Vonitsa, his forces were ambushed by Gjin Bua Shpata. The Hospitaller army was nearly annihilated, and many key commanders were killed. Heredia was captured and held for ransom. Afterward, Shpata recaptured Nafpaktos and sent a bishop named Matthew of Kernitza to the emperor and patriarch in Constantinople to inform them of his triumph. Vonitsa, however, remained under the control of the Tocco family, standing as the last surviving Latin foothold in Epirus.

== Aftermath ==
After capturing Heredia, Gjin Bua Shpata ransomed him to the Ottomans in the spring of 1379, receiving 8,000 florins.
