= Peter Bua =

Peter Bua Pjetër Bua
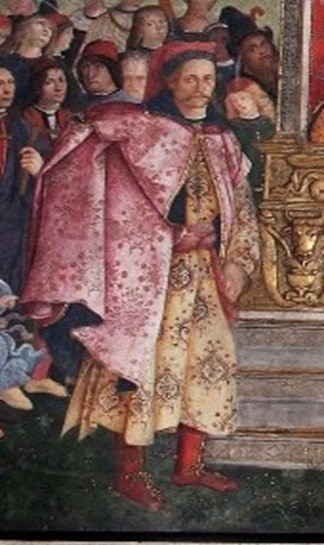
- A nobleman in the Disputation of St. Catherine of Alexandria by Pinturicchio, believed to be Peter Bua.
- Noble family: Bua Family
- Issue: Mercurio Bua
- Father: Either Alessio or Giovanni Bua
- Occupation: Chief instigator of the Morea revolt of 1453–1454; Spokesperson of Albanians in Morea; Commander of Stradioti

Peter Bua (Albanian: Pjetër Bua; fl. 1450s) was an Albanian nobleman of the late medieval Despotate of the Morea (Peloponnese) who was the chief instigator of the Morea revolt of 1453–1454. After the revolt, he was recognized by the Ottoman Empire as the official representative of the Albanians of the Morea.

== Biography ==
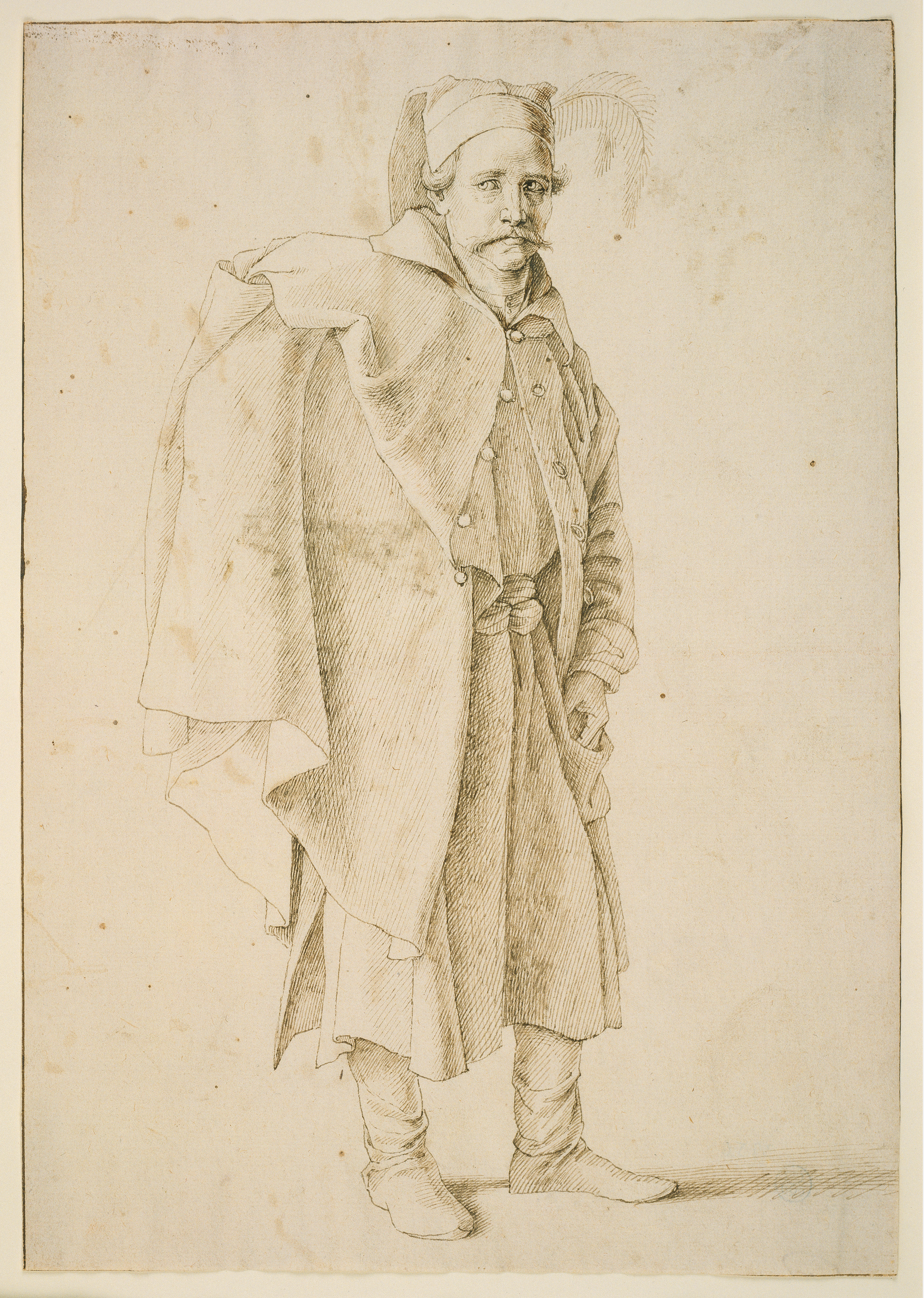
Orientale im Mantel, thought to be Peter Bua by Gentile Bellini

Pjetër Bua was a member of the Albanian Bua family. Pjetër's grandfather, Pavlo, was possibly Gjin Bua Shpata's son, who settled in Morea after leaving Nafpaktos in the hands of the Venetians. Pavlo had two sons named Alessio and Giovanni, one of whom was the father of Pjetër. Shortly after the fall of Constantinople and the death of the last Byzantine emperor, Constantine XI (r. 1449–1453), 30,000 Albanians led by Pjetër Bua rose in revolt against the two Despots of the Morea, Thomas and Demetrius II, due to the heavy tributes they had to pay. After the revolt failed, the Ottoman sultan Mehmed II (r. 1444‒1446; 1451‒1481), surnamed the Conqueror, recognised Pjetër Bua as the spokesperson of the Albanian population of the Morea. For a period of time, Pjetër Bua ruled the areas of the Morea that hadn't been conquered by the Ottomans. Bua was wounded in the leg during his battles and gained the nickname "the Lame". He fought in the Ottoman-Venetian War of 1463–1479, where he impressed the Venetians who gifted him a golden robe. In the period between 1467 and 1489, Peter Bua, as a commander of the Albanian stradioti, became one of the most well-known figures of distinguished warriors in the Republic of Venice and beyond in Italian opinion.
