= Battle of Achelous =

Battle of Achelous or Battle of Acheloos can refer to:

- Battle of Achelous (917), on the Moesian river, between the Byzantines and Bulgarians
- Battle of Achelous (1359), on the Aetolian river, between the Despotate of Epirus and Albanian chiefs
