= Peter Losha =

14th-century Albanian ruler in medieval Epirus

Pjetër Losha was an Albanian clan leader in medieval Epirus. He belonged to the Losha fis (clan or tribe) and was the leader of a combined force of his own clan and the fis of Mazaraki and Malakasi. In 1360, he became Despot of Arta, Rogoi and the area of Amphilochia. He died in 1374 and was succeeded by his close ally, Gjin Bua Shpata. The Chronicle of the Tocco is an important primary source for his life and the Albanians in medieval Epirus in general.

== Life ==
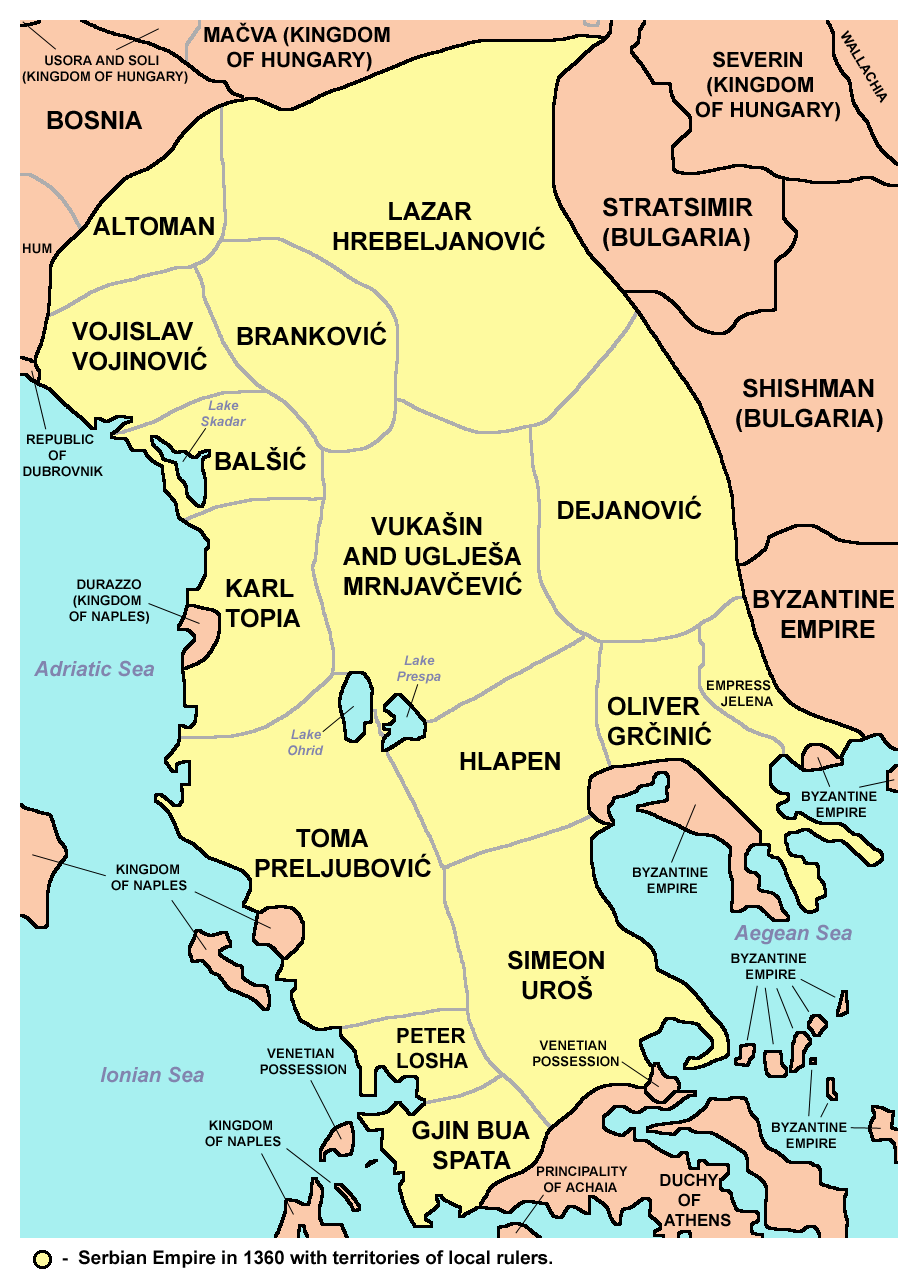
Map of the Serbian Empire with magnate provinces in c. 1360.

Losha's genealogy or birth date is unknown. He belonged to the Losha clan, which according to Aristidh Kola, was a branch of Bua tribe. Presumably he was born in Epirus as his tribe was from there as well. The word lios means "pockmark" in Albanian. He was part of the Albanian attacks in the remnants of Byzantine Epirus. In 1358–59, Albanian clans overran the regional feudal rulers and established themselves under Gjin Bua Shpata and Pjetër Losha. He had a son named Gjin. Losha led the Albanian force against Nikephoros II Orsini at the Battle of Achelous that won him the rule of Arta; he founded his domain around Arta with the help of the Mazaraki and Malakasi clans. The domains he gained after the battle also included Rogoi and Amphilochia, as mentioned in the Chronicle of Ioannina. In 1360, Simeon Uroš, the titular Serbian Emperor, in an attempt to avoid conflict with the Albanians and as an acknowledgment of their military strength decided to the leave the areas of Arta and Aetolia to Shpata and Losha.

In 1366, Toma Preljubović succeeded Simeon as ruler of Epirus. His rule marked a renewal of hostilities in the region as from 1367 to 1370, Ioannina, the capital of Preljubović, came under constant siege and was blocked by the Mazaraki and Malakasi clans under Losha. A truce was signed when Pjetër's son Gjin was betrothed to Thomas's daughter Irina. She died in the 1375 plague that affected the region and hostilities began again.

== Possessions ==
His estates included the Epirote cities of:

- Arta,
- Rogoi or Roga (modern Filippiada)
- Amphilochia

New title	Despot of Arta; Under the Serbian Empire; 1359–1374	Succeeded by Gjin Bua Spata
