= Nikephoros II (disambiguation) =

Nikephoros II or Nicephorus II may refer to:

- Nikephoros II Phokas (ca. 912–969), Byzantine emperor in 963–969
- Nikephoros II of Constantinople (died 1261), Metropolitan of Ephesus, Patriarch of Constantinople in 1260–1261
- Nikephoros II Orsini (1328–1359), Despot of Epirus in 1335–1340 and 1356–1359
