= Mercurio Bua =

Albanian condottiero (Stratioti captain) active in Italy

Mercurio Bua Mërkur Bua
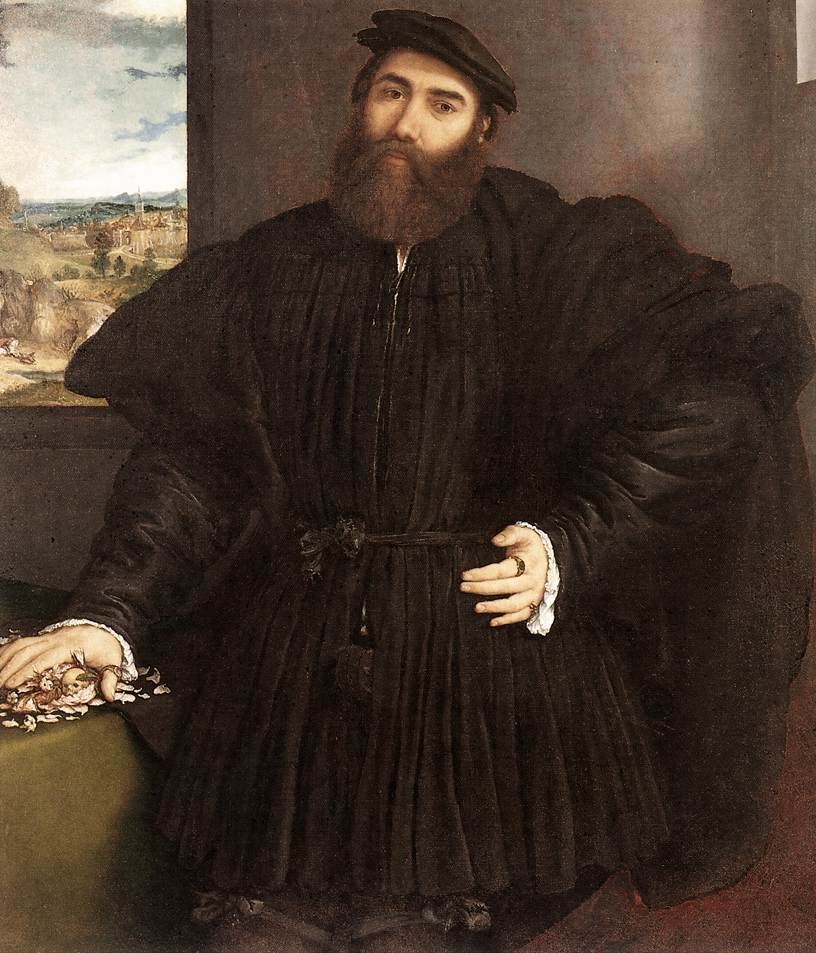
- Portrait of a Gentleman, thought to be Mercurio Bua by Lorenzo Lotto
- Born: 1478; Nafplion
- Died: Unknown (around 1542); Treviso
- Other name: Mercurio Buia
- Military career
- Rank: Condottiero (Stratioti Captain)
- Conflicts: Italian Wars; Italian War of 1494–1495; Italian Wars of 1499–1504; War of the League of Cambrai; War of Urbino; Italian War of 1521–1526; War of the League of Cognac; Italian War of 1536–1538; Italian War of 1542–1546

Mercurio Bua (Albanian: Mërkur Bua; Greek: Μερκούριος Μπούας, romanized: Merkourios Bouas; some modern sources use Buia) was an Albanian condottiero (Stratioti captain) active in Italy.

His father was Pjetër Bua, leader of the Albanians in the Morea in the 15th century. Born in Nauplia in 1478, Mercurio Bua moved to Venice in 1489 after his father's death and participated in the important phases of the Italian Wars serving the Republic of Venice, the Duke of Milan Ludovico Sforza, the Kingdom of France, the Holy Roman Emperor Maximilian I and then again Venice. He was held as one of the best generals in Italy in his time. For his deeds the King of France Louis XII rewarded him with the honorary title Count of Aquino and Roccasecca.

== Life ==
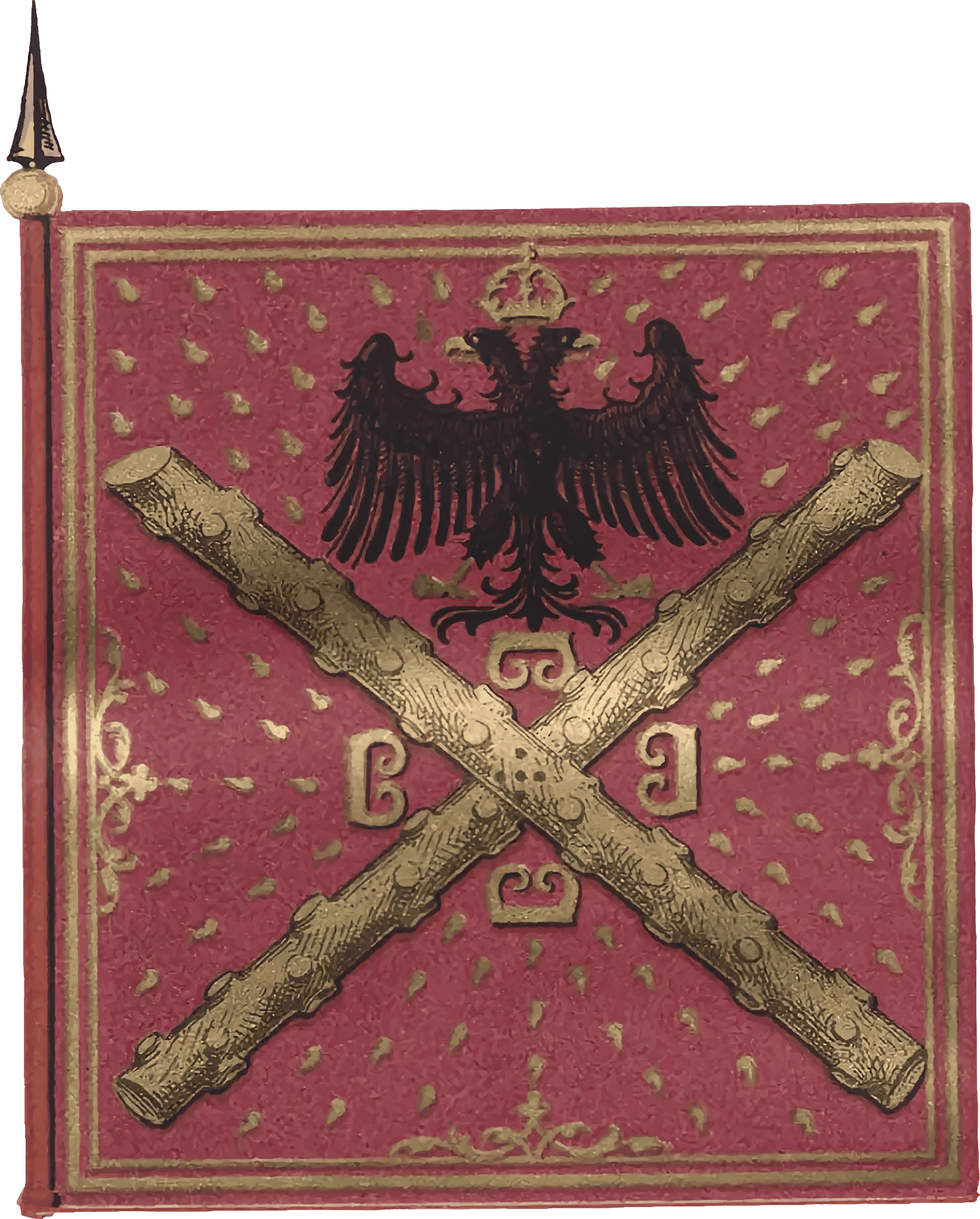
The red insignia with the black eagle and the cross of Saint Andrew was a gift by his Caesarean Majesty Emperor Maximilian for Captain general of the Leggeri cavalry (MDX).

Born in Nafplio in the Peloponnese, Mercurio was the son of Pjetër Bua (fl. 1450s), who belonged to the Albanian noble family of Bua that settled in Peloponnese, and who was the leader of the Albanian community of the region after the fall of the Despotate of the Morea. Mercurio was also related to the Thopia, Spata, Meksi and Zenevisi families.

As accounted by Giovanni Andrea Saluzzo, Lord of Castellar who participated in the Battle of Novara in 1500 as a trusted man of the marquess Ludovico II of Saluzzo against the Duke of Milan Ludovico il Moro, the Albanian captain Mercurio, who at that time was serving the Duke of Milan, was captured in Novara by a certain Duncan after the defeat of Ludovico il Moro. Taken into the prisons of Castellar for a few weeks, Mercurio was then liberated by Giovanni Andrea Saluzzo in June 6, 1500.

Later, placed under the French insignia, he participated in the war against the Spaniards in the Kingdom of Naples and was involved in the Battle of the Garigliano, in recognition of his enterprises, the Bua was invested by the King Louis XII of France of the fiefs of Aquino and Roccasecca. In 1506, however, he was in the army of the Chaumont, with which he fought against the Bolognese family of Bentivoglio, regaining the Felsineo capital to the sovereignty of the papal (Pope Julius II then granted him the sum of 1,000 florins as a reward for this enterprise). After other military actions in Lombardy and Piedmont, he went to Liguria, where, in 1507, he quelled the anti-French revolt that broke out in Genoa, decapitating the rebellious doge Paolo da Novi. In that same year, he was with Louis XII on his solemn entry into Milan. In 1508, however, he was hired by Emperor Maximilian I of Habsburg and sent to Flanders under the command of 400 stradiots: he first clashed with the troops of the Duke of Guelders, then took part in the War of Succession in Landshut, Bavaria.

Bua was described as having been

a grim-looking soldier, with a rough beard which brushed his cuirass, his head covered with a skull-cap, like the modern Greek capote, rallied his troopers in the open space, and brought them down upon the Huguenots with the speed of greyhounds.

A letter written by Bua has survived. He wrote it on 17 June 1506 and directed it to the treasury administration of the court of France as the capitaine de cent hommes de guerre de cheval albanoys ("Captain of 100 Albanian cavalrymen and men-of-war") in relation to the payment of his company.

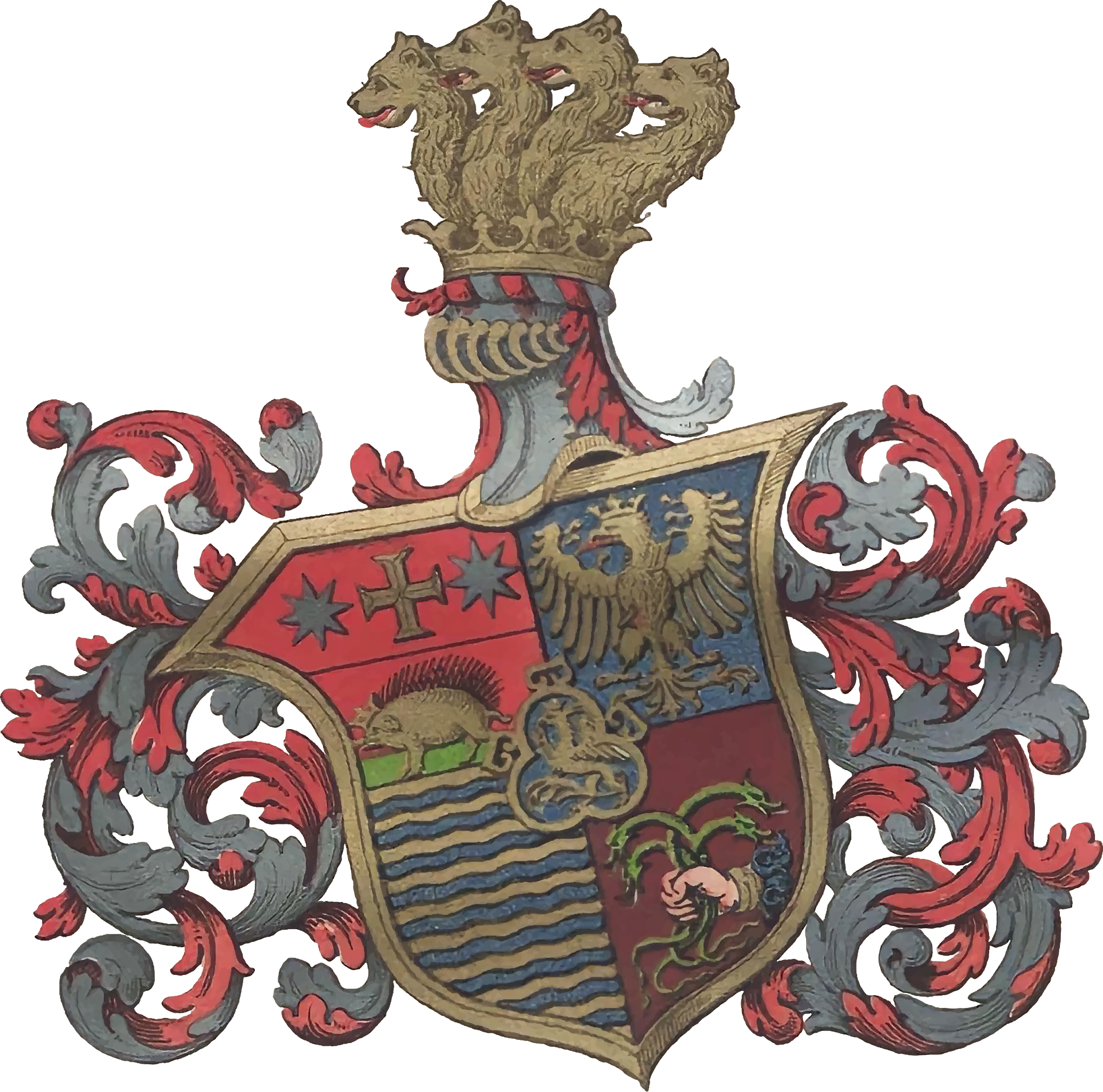
The armorial of Mercurio Bua features within the shield, on the upper right corner, an azure insignia with the eagle displayed in dexter position, belonging to the Despot of Argyrokastron, whose realm bears the symbols of the House of Bua.

His Albanian stratioti were described as the best cavalry of the age, supported by the fact that they were always employed by European monarchs. Himself, Bua was ranked as one of the best generals in Italy. In 1515, Bua was given the command of all the stratioti of the Venetian army, which caused unrest among the Greek officers.

Starting in 1509, after the outbreak of the Third Italian War (also called the War of the League of Cambrai), he returned to Italy, carrying out looting and raids precisely in the territories of that Venetian Republic that had first welcomed him: his raids are known in the country of Bassano, Soave, Caldiero, Cittadella, Castelfranco, Nervesa and near the hills of Montello; he conquered the castles of Lonigo (where he carried out a horrible massacre by massacring more than 1,500 inhabitants and setting fire to their homes). On 9 May of that year, he participated in the famous battle of Agnadello, overwhelming the troops of the Venetian leader Bartolomeo d'Alviano. He also took part in the siegies of Padua (1509) and Treviso (1511). It is perhaps in this period (in 1510) that Maximilian of Habsburg gave Bua the title of count of the Holy Roman Empire. The Bua became famous, in these years, also for the capture of the castle of Quero (1509), a Venetian fortress built along the Piave at the foot of the Bellunese Prealpi: a Greek celebratory poem of the sixteenth century tells that the Bua threw himself swimming into the river, followed by his own, bypassing the defenders and taking them by surprise. Prisoner of excellence was the captain of the castle, Gerolamo Emiliani, belonging to the patrician family of the Miani, who, chained and forced to follow the stradriots of Bua in their raids in the upper Trevigian, he would then be miraculously freed. Returning to Treviso after his imprisonment, the Miani brought in ex-voto his chains (still visible today) to the venerated fresco of the Madonna and Child, in the church of Santa Fosca in Santa Maria Maggiore.

He distinguished himself in the battle of Creazzo against the Spaniards, receiving the praise of Alviano and thus earning access to the Collegio dei Savi. In 1514, he moved towards Polesine and reconquered Rovigo, taking the Spanish commissioner prisoner; later, he carried out other brilliant military operations against Spaniards and Germans, capturing weapons and horses from the enemy. After having sacked the country of Trento, he entered Este and subsequently flanked Alviano in the new reconquest of Rovigo, previously reoccupied by the Spaniards: the General Domenico Contarini praised his audacity again. In September 1515, it was, however, on the field of the famous battle of Marignano, where Venetians and French resented the Swiss across the Alps, and it seems that on this occasion, with a heroic action of his stradiots, he managed to save the life of the king of France, who was present on the battlefield. That same evening, the sovereign would have embraced him by publicly acclaiming him as his own saviour.

Mercurio Bua died in Treviso, (Italy) between 1542 and 1545, where earlier he served as captain of a unit of 50 soldiers. He is buried in Santa Maria Maggiore in the same city near the tomb of his wife. In 1562, a marble monument was erected on his tomb, made by Antonio Lombardo. In 1637, the following inscription was made on the monument:

Mercurio Bua Comiti E. Principibus Peloponnesi
Epirotarum Equitum Ductori,
Anno Salu. MDCXXXVII.

Which means "To Count Mercurio Bua, Prince of Peloponnesus, Leader of the Epirote Horsemen, Year of our Salvation, 1637". The monument also lists some of his military career.

== Marriages and children ==
His first marriage was in 1519 to Maria Boccali, the daughter of Niccolò Boccali and princess Katerina Arianiti. The couple had a son named Flavio Bua. Maria always lived in Venice, even when Mercurio served the Holy Roman Empire. She died in 1524 and was buried in Santa Maria di Treviso. In 1525, Mercurio married Elisabetta Balbi, daughter of Alvise Balbi. With her, Mercurio had four children: Elena Maria, Curio, Polissena and Alessandro. Elisabetta died in or before 1528.

== In culture ==
The life of Bua had been dramatised in the works of Tzanes Koronaios (Zanetto Coroneo). Koronaios, who had been stradiotti-troubadour of Zantiote origin, was a companion of Mercurio Bua. In his work, a long epic poem in vernacular Greek on the exploits, bravery and military victories of Mercurio Bua, Koronaios gives Bua's mythological pedigree, which includes Achilles, Alexander the Great and Pyrrhus. A possible answer on why this work was written in Greek and not in Italian or even medieval Albanian would be that the close environment of Mercurio Bua spoke primarily Greek, retained its Byzantine traditions and cultural identity. In this work he was praised as "chosen among the Hellenes" or in another verse as "rampart of the Albanians" This poem was found in a manuscript in Italy and was published partially by C. Hopf and in its entirety by Constantine Sathas. It was written in 1519 when Koronaios was in Venice and refers to Bua's history till 1517. It consists of about 4.500 rhyming verses and contains valuable historical information. Koronaios wrote and sent to Bua also a smaller poem (“pittakion”) of about 125 verses in the Greek language, too.

Another mention of a Mercurio Bua exists in the Histoire des guerres civiles de France by Enrico Caterino Davila. There was a man named Mercurio Bua who was active in the service of the king of France in the 1580s. He was present as a commander of a unit of light cavalry at the Battle of Coutras in 1587, leading an ill-fated cavalry charge that led to his unit being diverted away from the decisive action, thus contributing to a catastrophic defeat of the royal army. Nevertheless, it is unknown if it is the same person.

== Sources ==
=== Bibliography ===
- Comba, Rinaldo, ed. (2005). Ludovico II marchese di Saluzzo: Il governo del marchesato fra guerra, politica e diplomazia. Ludovico II marchese di Saluzzo: condottiero, uomo di stato, mecenate (1475-1504) : atti del convegno : Saluzzo, 10-12 dicembre 2004. Vol. 1. Società per gli studi storici, archeologici ed artistici della provincia di Cuneo. ISBN 9788866250050.
- Floristán, José M. (2019). "Stradioti albanesi al servizio degli Asburgo di Spagna (I): le famiglie albanesi Bua, Crescia e Renesi". Shêjzat – Pleiades (1–2).
- Gramaticopolo, Andrea (2016). Stradioti: alba, fortuna e tramonto dei mercenari greco-albanesi al servizio della Serenissima (in Italian). Soldiershop Publishing. ISBN 9788893270489.
- Bujduveanu, Tănase (1997). Romanitatea balcanică si civilizația aromânilor. Editura Cartea Aromână. ISBN 978-973-97740-3-1.
- Giurescu, Constantin C.; Giurescu, Dinu C. (1976). Istoria Românilor: De la mijlocul secolului al XIV-lea pînă la începutul secolului al XVII lea. Editura științifică.
- Bassani, Lucia Nadin (2008). Migrazioni e integrazione: il caso degli Albanesi a Venezia (1479-1552). Bulzoni. ISBN 978-88-7870-340-7.
- Xhufi, Pëllumb (2013). ""Kombi Shqiptar" - një veshtrim nga mesjeta". Studime Historike. 03–04: 8.
