= Thomas Preljubović =

- Despot of Epirus
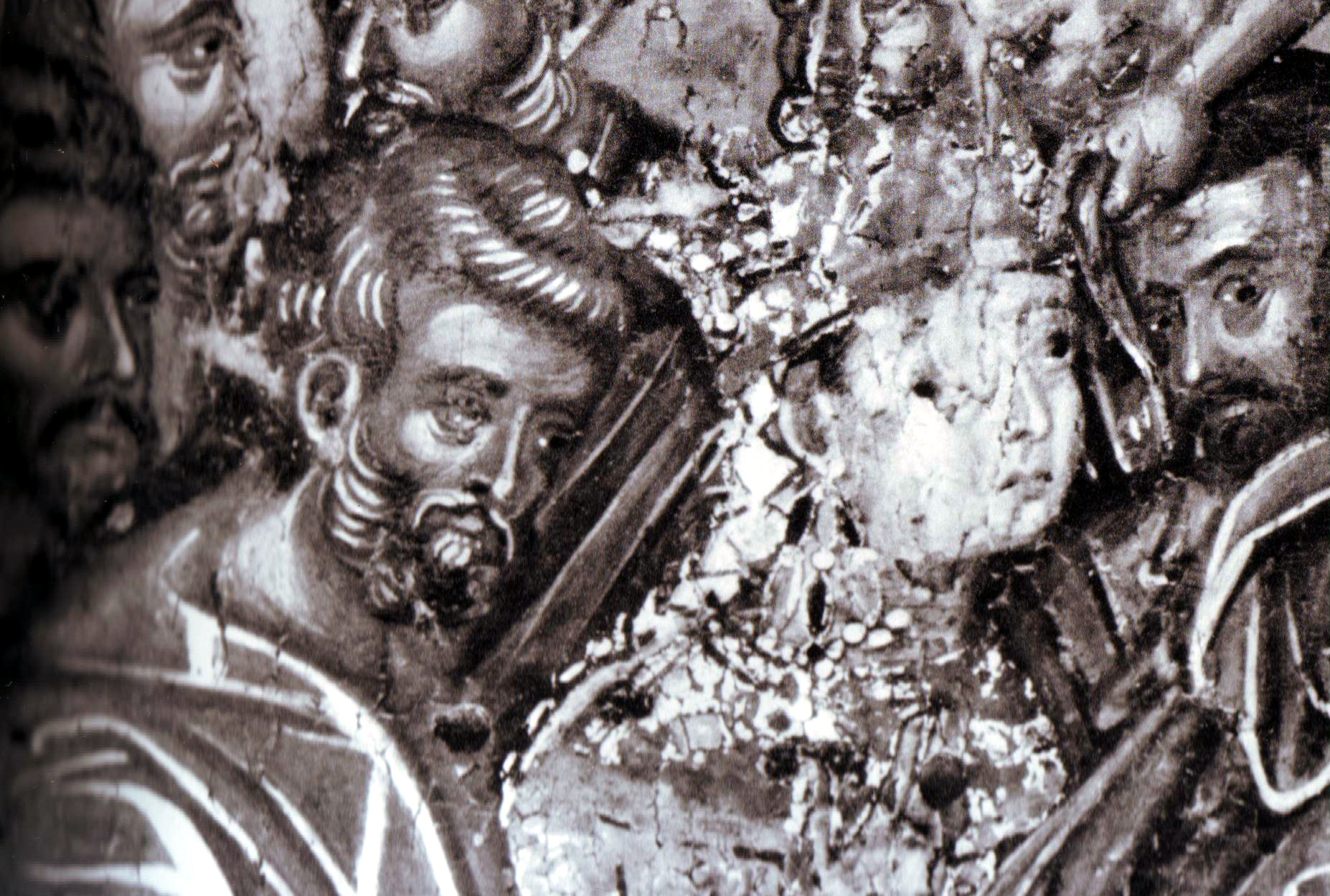
- Thomas and Maria Paleologina
- Reign: 1367–1384
- Predecessor: Simeon Uroš
- Successor: Maria Palaeologina
- Born: 14th century
- Died: December 23, 1384; Ioannina, Despotate of Epirus
- Spouse: Maria Palaeologina
- Issue: see Family
- Father: caesar Preljub
- Mother: Irene
- Religion: Serbian Orthodox Christian

Thomas Preljubović (Serbian: Тома Прељубовић, romanized: Toma Preljubović; Greek: Θωμάς Κομνηνός Παλαιολόγος, romanized: Thōmas Komnēnos Palaiologos) was ruler of the Despotate of Epirus in Ioannina from 1367 to his death in 1384. Thomas was an unpopular ruler and is appraised very negatively by his contemporaries. On December 23, 1384 he was stabbed to death by his guards at dawn. The conspiracy of the faction which overthrew him involved his wife Maria Angelina who succeeded him.

A great deal of his rule was preoccupied with fighting against the Albanians of the Despotate of Arta to his south, the Zenebishi family to his north and the Mazreku and other clans to his northwest. Thomas gave himself the self-styled epithet of Albanian-slayer (Greek: Αλβανοκτόνος/Αλβανιτόκτονος) after torturing Albanian prisoners in order to terrify his enemies.

== Life ==
=== Early years ===
Thomas was the son of caesar Gregorios Preljub (Greek: Grēgorios Prealimpos), the Serbian governor of Thessaly, who died in late 1355 or early 1356. His mother Princess Irene Nemanjić was a daughter of Dušan the Mighty, Emperor of Serbia and his wife, Helena of Bulgaria.

After the violent death of his father, Thomas' claim to Thessaly was asserted by his mother Irene, but they were forced to flee to Serbia by the advance of Nikephoros II Orsini in 1356. Here, Irene married Radoslav Hlapen, the ruler of Vodena, who took Thomas under his wing.

During the absence of Thessaly's new ruler, Simeon Uroš Palaiologos, in the Despotate of Epirus in 1359–1360, Hlapen invaded Thessaly, attempting to win it for his stepson. Although Simeon Uroš managed to contain the invasion, he was forced to cede Kastoria to Thomas and to marry him to his daughter Maria.

Over the next several years, Simeon Uroš recognized that he could not assert effective authority over most of Epirus and delegated power in Arta and Angelokastron to local Albanian lords. In 1366 the citizens of Ioannina, the last major fortress to remain under Simeon Uroš's control, sent him a petition to appoint a governor who could protect them from the raids of Albanian nobles.

Simeon Uroš responded by designating Thomas as his governor and forwarding the Ioanninan and Vagenetian (Thesprotian) embassy to him. Thomas arrived in Ioannina from Edessa in 1367 with a large army and was originally applauded by the city's population. Despite his early popularity, not all the citizens of Ioannina or the Greek commanders of the towns of Paramythia and Arachovitsa supported his rule.

=== Reign ===
Thomas' reign in Ioannina is reflected in detail in the Chronicle of Ioannina. Primary sources, including the Chronicle of Ioannina treat him in a negative outlook and reflect the hostility towards him by his contemporaries. The Chronicle depicts him as a cruel and capricious tyrant, describing him as "wicked", a "merciless sadist" and a "murderer", "greedy and avaricious" and special mention is made to his tyrannical actions towards the church, the nobility and regular citizens of Ioannina. According to historian Donald Nicol, the Chronicle is "deeply prejudiced" against Thomas.

The two successive outbreaks of plague that occurred in Ioannina in 1374 and 1375 caused the loss of his daughter.

Among the unpopular initiatives he is said to have taken were the intolerable taxation, the confiscation of church property as well as the imposition of monopolies on various commodities, including fish, cheese, vegetables and fruit. Thomas seized various properties of the Church of Ioannina and awarded them to his Serbian retainers. In 1382 a new appointee to the local archbishopric, Matthew, was sent out from Constantinople, and invested Thomas with the title of despotes on behalf of the Byzantine Emperor John V Palaiologos. Nevertheless, later Thomas quarreled with the archbishop and exiled him from Ioannina. Thomas is said to have forcefully married the widows of local Greek noblemen to Serbian husbands so as to alienate their property. He undoubtedly became quite unpopular by the Greek population by settling Serbs into the church and the administration. However, several of his initiatives were essential for the financial support of his almost continuous warfare against the Albanians including the construction of defensive works and the payment of armed units.

Some of the local nobility enjoyed favorable treatment of Thomas including Koutzotheodoros, Manuel Tziblos and Michael Apsaras. The later being awarded the title of protovestiarios after denouncing his own first cousin, Nikephoros Batalas, who was as a result blinded and exiled with his family. On the other hand the first secretary Manuel Philanthropenos was poisoned and the Prokathemenos of Ioannina was imprisoned, then exiled and finally murdered for alleged treason.

==== Warfare ====
Under Peter Losha, the despot of Arta, the Albanian Mazaraki and Malakasioi tribes attacked and at times blockaded Ioannina during the first three years of Thomas' reign. Thomas betrothed his daughter to Losha's son in 1370 as a means to end the conflict. Ioannina enjoyed peace for the following five years. His actions during this peaceful period are described as "tyrranical and destructive" towards the people of Ioannina with the local Albanians and their children as his main target.

In 1374, Pjetër Losha died of the plague in Arta, after which Gjin Bua Shpata took over the city. At this time he was not bound by agreement to Thomas; he laid siege to Ioannina and ravaged the country-side. Thomas brought peace when he betrothed his sister Helena to Gjin Bua Shpata the following year.

However, sporadic and often savage warfare still occurred between Ioannina and Albanians. Other Albanian tribes continued their offensives against Ioannina, such as the Malakasioi, who were defeated by Thomas in 1377 and 1379. After the failed siege of 1377, the chieftain Gjin Phrates was dragged in triumph through the streets of Ioannina and the other captives were sold into slavery. Despite Thomas' victory, the Albanians managed to get away with much plunder.

In 1379, in yet another unsuccessful siege the Malakasioi met a well organized resistance by the outnumbered citizens of Ioannina who finally succeeded to defeat the invaders. Two hundred Albanian besiegers who had entered the castle area surrendered to Thomas, who badly mistreated his prisoners. Albanians were sold into slavery, while a group of Bulgarians and Vlachs who were captured after the siege were mutilated. In reference to Basil II who was nicknamed Bulgar-Slayer (Boulgaroktónos), Thomas styled himself with the epithet "Albanian-Slayer" (Αλβανοκτόνος, Albanoktonos). His actions led Gjin Bua Shpata to besiege the city and to devastate the surrounding fields and vineyards in March 1379. As a response during the siege Thomas hung prisoners from the walls and threw mutilated body parts of his prisoners from the castle walls. In May 1379, Gjin Bua Shpata devastated the countryside of Ioannina. The Chronicle of Ioannina attributes the victory of the defenders to the people of Ioannina and Archangel Michael; the city's protector saint, with Thomas receiving no credit by its author.

In 1380 Thomas passed to the offensive having also secured Ottoman support. The latter responded promptly and dispatched an auxiliary force and finally Thomas took a number of fortresses from his enemies in 1381–1384. He managed to expand his control in Dryinopolis, Velas, Boursina, Krezounista, Dragomi and Vagenetia and most of the land previously under the control of the Malakasioi tribe. The Albanians, in particular the Mazreku of the Kalamas area, held firm against him. In 1384, an Ottoman Turkish army led by Timurtash Bey attacked Arta and took many prisoners. Gjin Bua Shpata sent Matthew, the bishop of Arta and his counselor Kalognomos to propose an anti-Ottoman pact to Thomas, but he rejected it. Led "by his hatred towards the Albanians", according to the Chronicle, Thomas maltreated Gjin's delegation. Matthew was sent into exile and Kalognomos was imprisoned.

=== Death ===
Thomas used the hostilities with the Albanians as the justification for his tyrannical rule over Ioannina and his alliance to the Ottomans, but as the hostilities subsided, his regime could no longer justify its actions. Thomas certainly dealt in a savage manner with many Greeks of Ioannina whom he suspected of conspiring against him. Eventually, a coalition of collaborators that included Thomas' wife Maria participated in a conspiracy against him. On December 23, 1384, Thomas was assassinated in his bed by his own bodyguards. His assassination happened at dawn, five hours in the morning when he was stabbed to death by his guards Nikephorakes, Rainakes, Artabastos and Anton the Frank, according to the Chronicle of Ioannina.

Upon his death, the population of Ioannina gathered in the cathedral where the basilissa Maria Angelina was acclaimed their despoina. Her brother John Uroš Doukas Palaiologos was invited to come and advise her in governance. Thomas' collaborators were punished and the protovestiarios, Michael Apsaras, was imprisoned and exiled.

== Bibliography ==
- Agoritsas, Demetrios C. (2014). "Maria Angelina Doukaina Palaiologina and her depictions in post-byzantine mural paintings". Zbornik radova Vizantoloskog instituta (51): 171–185. doi:10.2298/zrvi1451171a.
- Fine, John V. A. (1994) [1987]. The Late Medieval Balkans: A Critical Survey from the Late Twelfth Century to the Ottoman Conquest. Ann Arbor, Michigan: University of Michigan Press. ISBN 978-0-472-10079-8.
- Kazhdan, Alexander, ed. (1991). The Oxford Dictionary of Byzantium. Oxford and New York: Oxford University Press. ISBN 0-19-504652-8.
- Miller, William (1908). The Latins in the Levant: A History of Frankish Greece (1204–1566). London: John Murray.
- Nicol, Donald MacGillivray (1984). The Despotate of Epiros, 1267-1479: A Contribution to the History of Greece in the Middle Ages. Cambridge University Press. ISBN 978-0-521-26190-6.
- Nicol, Donald MacGillivray (1997). "Late Byzantine Period (1204–1479)". Epirus, 4000 Years of Greek History and Civilization. Ekdotike Athenon: 198–237. ISBN 9789602133712.
- Osswald, Brendan (2011). L'Epire du treizième au quinzième siècle : autonomie et hétérogénéité d'une région balkanique (Thesis). Université Toulouse le Mirail - Toulouse II.
- Sansaridou-Hendrickx, Thekla (2010). "The Albanians in the Chronicle(s) of Ioannina: An Anthropological Approach". Acta Patristica et Byzantina. 21 (2): 287–306. doi:10.1080/10226486.2010.11879131. S2CID 163742869.
- Sansaridou-Hendrickx, Thekla (2011). "Maria Angelina Palaiologina: Abused Wife or Husband-Slayer?". Journal of Early Christian History. 1 (1): 131–142. doi:10.1080/2222582X.2011.11877234. ISSN 2222-582X.
- Soulis, George Christos (1984), The Serbs and Byzantium during the reign of Tsar Stephen Dušan (1331–1355) and his successors, Dumbarton Oaks, ISBN 0-88402-137-8

Preceded by Simeon Uroš	Ruler of Epirus; 1367–1384	Succeeded by Maria
