= Michael Apsaras =

Michael Apsaras (Greek: Μιχαήλ Ἀψαρᾶς) was a 14th-century Greek noble from Ioannina.

Apsaras came from a noble Byzantine family and one of the most influential families in the city of Ioannina. Apsaras received the title of protovestiarios and became chief minister of the Despot of Epirus, Thomas Preljubović (1366–1384). Both Apsaras and Thomas were negatively portrayed in the Chronicle of Ioannina due to the cruelty they displayed against the local population of Ioannina.

Apsaras was exiled from Ioannina after the assassination of Thomas.
