= Maria Angelina Doukaina Palaiologina =

Maria Angelina of Epirus
- Basilissa
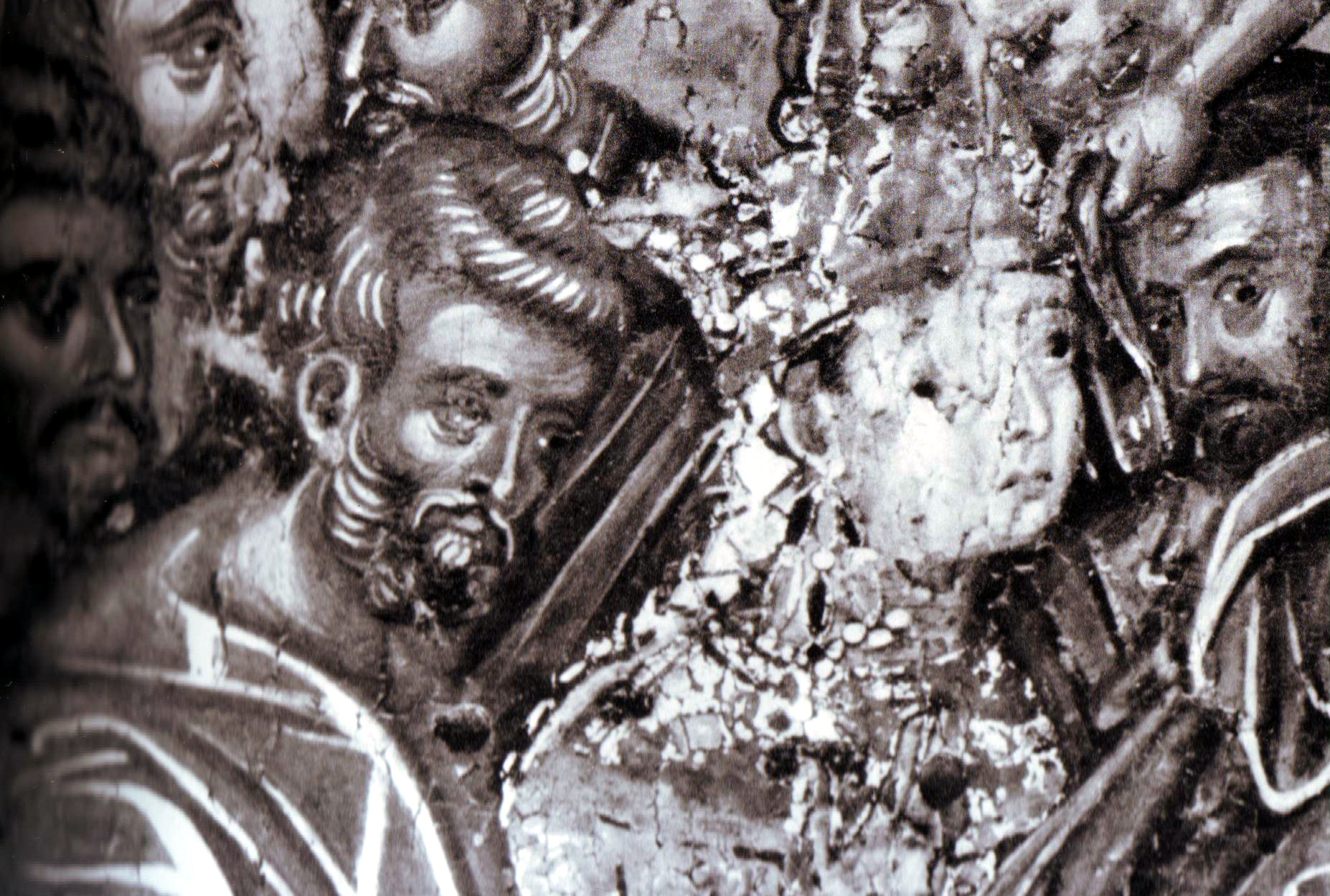
- Thomas and Maria Paleologina

Ruler of Epirus
- Reign: 23 December 1384 – February 1385
- Predecessor: Thomas
- Successor: Esau

Consort of Epirus
- Tenure: 1366–1384, 1385–1394
- Monarchs: Thomas (1366–1384); Esau (since 1385)
- Born: 1349
- Died: 28 December 1394 (aged 44–45); Ioannina, Despotate of Epirus
- Spouse: Thomas Preljubović; Esau de' Buondelmonti
- House: Nemanjić
- Father: Simeon Uroš
- Mother: Thomais Orsini
- Religion: Eastern Orthodox Christian

Maria Angelina Doukaina Palaiologina, also known as Marija Angelina Nemanjić or Anna Maria Angelina Doukaina Palaiologina (Greek: Μαρία Αγγελίνα Δούκαινα Παλαιολογίνα, Serbian Cyrillic: Марија Ангелина Немањић; 1349 – 28 December 1394), was a Byzantine Greek-Serbian aristocrat and self-proclaimed basilissa (Greek: βασίλισσα; Empress or queen) of Epirus from 1384 to 1385, succeeding the rule of her murdered husband, Thomas Preljubović. Maria and her husband were a famed couple and patrons of the arts during Thomas's rule of Ioannina from 1366 to 1384. She is depicted in icons.

== Life ==
Maria was the daughter of the Serbian Emperor of Thessaly, Simeon Uroš, the half-brother of Emperor Stephen Uroš IV Dušan of Serbia (of the Nemanjić dynasty), and Thomais Orsini. Her maternal grandfather was John Orsini of Epirus. In 1361, Maria, then only 12 years old, married Thomas Preljubović, who was appointed governor (despot) of Epirus in Ioannina by her father in 1366. Popular with her subjects, she was allegedly mistreated by her husband and is said to have connived in his murder on 23 December 1384.

The population of Ioannina acclaimed Maria as a ruler. She used the title of basilissa, the female form of basileus. She summoned her brother John Uroš Doukas Palaiologos (later tonsured as a monk at the Meteora monastery under the name Joasaph), to advise her in the affairs of state, although he did not stay long.

John Uroš suggested that Maria marry Esau de' Buondelmonti, one of the Latin noblemen captured by Thomas in 1379. It has been alleged that Maria was already enamored of the captive before the murder of her husband, and that this affair led to the assassination of Thomas. These claims, however, remain conjectural.

Maria married Esau (who sought recognition from Byzantium) in February 1385. Maria survived for another decade, dying on 28 December 1394. She was 55.

Upon Esau's assumption of power, John Uroš left for Meteora, where he was tonsured and took the name of Joasaph. He died in 1422.

The Chronicle of Ioannina, so hostile towards Thomas Preljubović, describes Maria in very flattering terms; the Byzantine historian Laonikos Chalkokondyles, however, portrays her as an unfaithful wife of questionable morality. Both accounts may reflect authorial bias. Maria does not appear to have had surviving children from either marriage.

== Sources ==
- Fine, John V. A. (1994) [1987]. The Late Medieval Balkans: A Critical Survey from the Late Twelfth Century to the Ottoman Conquest. Ann Arbor, Michigan: University of Michigan Press. ISBN 978-0-472-10079-8.
- Kazhdan, Alexander, ed. (1991). The Oxford Dictionary of Byzantium. Oxford and New York: Oxford University Press. ISBN 0-19-504652-8.
- Miller, William (1908). The Latins in the Levant: A History of Frankish Greece (1204–1566). London: John Murray.
- Nicol, Donald M. (1984). The Despotate of Epiros, 1267–1479: A Contribution to the History of Greece in the Middle Ages. Cambridge: Cambridge University Press. ISBN 978-0-521-13089-9.
- Soulis, George Christos (1984), The Serbs and Byzantium during the reign of Tsar Stephen Dušan (1331–1355) and his successors, Dumbarton Oaks, ISBN 0-88402-137-8

Regnal titles
Preceded by Thomas Preljubović	Ruler of Epirus; December 23, 1384 – February 1385	Succeeded by Esau de' Buondelmonti
