= Bua (tribe) =

Albanian tribe and noble family

The Bua were a medieval Albanian tribe. The name is first attested in 14th-century historical documents as one of the Albanian tribes living in the Despotate of Epirus. Later on, the Bua settled southwards in the Peloponnese, and a part of them found refuge in Italy in the Arbëreshë migrations that followed the Ottoman conquest of the Balkans. A branch of the tribe regiments was ennobled in the Holy Roman Empire after its service in the Stratioti, a Balkan mercenary unit. Mërkur Bua (1478 – c. 1542), its most prominent member, was Count of Aquino and Roccasecca.

== Name ==
Bua appears in historical record as both a given name and as a surname. It is often accompanied by the surname Shpata. John VI Kantakouzenos's History written in second half of the 14th century is the first primary source about the Bua tribe. Kantakouzenos writes that the "Albanian tribes of Mazaraki, Bua, Malakasioi were named so after the names of their leaders." Albanian clans traditionally bore the name of their first leader or progenitor, but after intermarriage between different leading families, the identification of the clans became intricate, as in the case of Muriki Bua Spata, who was perhaps the offspring of both Bua and Spata clans.

According to the Greek historian Constantine Sathas, the surname Bua derived from the name of the river Buna in Albania and Montenegro, while poet Giuseppe Schirò suggested that the original form of the name was Buchia, from which stem the two forms Bugia and Bokoi. According to Schirò, from the latter derived the form Koboi attested in the Chronicle of the Tocco, and from the indefinite form Kobua, through apheresis of the initial syllable, ultimately derived Bua. Another possible derivation is from Albanian bua ('buffalo').

== History ==
They were semi-nomadic pastoralists, organized in katuns and had no central leadership. From that time, they appear in the history of the Despotate of Epirus and the involvement of Gjin Bua Shpata in the region. The Bua are believed to be not patrilineally kin (blood relatives) with the Shpata tribe. However this theory is rejected and their first name was Bua, while the name Spata appears to them as a second name, creating a cadet branch of the Buas. The Buas claimed to be descendants of Pyrrhus of Epirus. Mercurio Bua had a genealogy drawn up for this purpose and found no contradiction. The coat of arms granted to him therefore reproduced the alleged arms of the ancient kings of Epirus, enriched by the cross with two stars supposedly granted to the Bua by the Emperor Constantine the Great, who stopped in their castle in Albania when he left Rome to go and found Constantinople. The Meksi family is believed to be the first branch of Bua tribe. Many of the leaders of the Despotate of Arta appears with Bua as a second surname in historical record. As such, in historiography the Bua are considered to have been among the rulers of the Despotate of Arta and the regions of Aetolia and Acarnania to the south after the Battle of Achelous until 1416. After their loss, the Venetians invited the Bua tribe to settle in the Morea. In 1423, they appear in Venetian records in the Morea under the leadership of Rossus Bua, capu unius comitive Albanensium. The Bua tribe established in Morea amounted to about one or two thousand people in 1423, and consisted of four katunds.

After the fall of much of the Morea to the Ottomans, Venice invited them to settle in the Ionian Islands, in particular in Zakynthos in 1473. Many branches of them settled in Italy after 1479 as part of the Arbëreshë migrations. In Italy, many of them joined Stratioti regiments. Between 1481 and 1570, at least 44 Buas appear as stratioti captains. Among them two Gjin, Gjon, Bardh Bua. The best known was Mërkur Bua who in time was ennobled. In modern Greece, in 1504 a branch of the Albanian tribe of Bua who remained in the Ionian Islands were part of the colonization of the abandoned island of Ithaca. The Boua-Grivas as they came to be known in the late 16th century produced the anti-Ottoman rebel and armatolos Theodore Boua-Grivas who started a revolt in Epirus and Acarnania in 1585 with Venetian support.

== Members ==
- Gjin Bua Shpata, recognized as a ruler in Epirus and Aetolia by Simeon Uroš in 1359–1360
- Peter Bua (fl. 1450s), leader of the Albanian community in the Peloponnese after the fall of the Despotate of the Morea.
- Theodore Bua (fl. 1479), Venetian mercenary captain
- Mercurio Bua (1478–1542), Venetian mercenary captain, son of Pjetër Bua.
- Andrés Bua, Stratiot of the Habsburg Empire of Charles V
- Michele Bua, Stratioti captain in Flanders, France and Italy

== Sources ==
=== Bibliography ===
- Floristán, José M. (2019). "Stradioti albanesi al servizio degli Asburgo di Spagna (I): le famiglie albanesi Bua, Crescia e Renesi". Shêjzat – Pleiades (1–2).
- Gramaticopolo, Andrea (2016). Stradioti: alba, fortuna e tramonto dei mercenari greco-albanesi al servizio della Serenissima (in Italian). Soldiershop Publishing. ISBN 9788893270489.
- Kollias, A. (1990). Αρβανίτες και η καταγωγή των Ελλήνων [Arvanites and the Origin of the Greeks] (in Greek) (6th ed.). Athens.
- Osswald, Brendan (2007). "Imagining frontiers, contesting identities". In Ellis, Steven G.; Klusáková, Lud'a (eds.). The Ethnic Composition of Medieval Epirus. Edizioni Plus. ISBN 978-88-8492-466-7.
- Schirò, Giuseppe (1971–1972). "La genealogia degli Spata tra il XIV e XV sec. E due Bua sconosciuti". Rivista di Studi Bizantini e Neoellenici. 28–29: 67–85.
- Schirò, Giuseppe; Biblioteca Apostolica Vaticana (1975). Chronikon tōn Tokkōn tēs Kephallēnias. Rome: Accademia nazionale dei Lincei.
- Valentini, Giuseppe (1956). Il diritto delle comunità nella tradizione giuridica albanese; generalità. Vallecchi.
- Miller, William (2014). Essays on the Latin Orient. Cambridge University Press. ISBN 978-1107455535.
- Sansaridou-Hendrickx, Thekla (2017). "The Albanians in the Chronicle(s) of Ioannina: An Anthropological Approach". Acta Patristica et Byzantina. 21 (2): 287–306. doi:10.1080/10226486.2010.11879131. S2CID 163742869.
