= Chronicle of Ioannina =

14th century chronicle

The Chronicle of Ioannina is a prose chronicle written in Greek about the history of Ioannina during the rule of Thomas Preljubović, the Serb Despot of Epirus, who was based in Ioannina in the second half of the 14th century.

The Chronicle was first attributed to the monks Proklos and Komnenos, and was therefore initially known as the Chronicle of Proklos and Komnenos. The Chronicle is deeply prejudiced and hostile against Preljubović. It portrays Thomas Preljubović as a ruthless and despotic tyrant, while his wife Maria Angelina Doukaina Palaiologina is described with more flattering words.

The Chronicle of Ioannina is an invaluable source of information on the history of the Epirus region during the late Middle Ages. Among other information, it mentions a naval landing in Lake Pamvotis on February 26, 1379, by Albanian, Bulgarian and Vlach (Aromanian) raiders.

A manuscript of the Chronicle of Ioannina, Christ Church 49, features a small glossary from Epirus of the Aromanian language. German Byzantinist Peter Schreiner dated this glossary to the 16th or 17th century based on its writing.

== Sources ==
- L. Vranousis, Chronika tis mesaionikis kai tourkokratoumenis Epirou [Chronicles of Epirus during the Middle Ages and the Turkish Rule], Ioannina 1962
- L. Vranousis, “To Chronikon ton Ioanninwn kat’ anekdoton dimodi epitomin” [Chronicle of Ioannina according to anecdotal popular tradition], Academy of Athens, Medieval Archive Yearbook, 12 (1962), pp. 57–115.
- P. Aravantinos, Chronographia tis Epirou [Chronography of Epirus], vol. B’, publ. Koultoura, Athens, p. 131.
