= Gjin Bua Shpata =

14th-century Albanian ruler in western Greece

- Despot of Arta
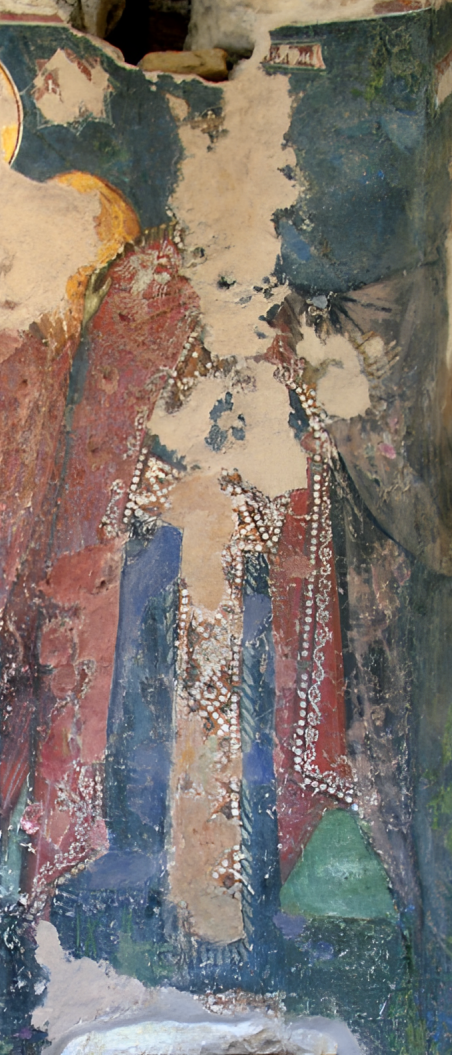
- Depiction of Gjin Bua Shpata or possibly Muriq Shpata, Church of the Parigoritissa, Arta, late 14th-early 15th century.
- Born: First half of the 14th century Epirus
- Died: 29 October 1399
- Spouse: Unknown; Helena Preljubović
- Issue: Irene Shpata; Unknown Daughter
- House: Shpata family
- Father: Pjetër Bua
- Religion: Eastern Orthodoxy

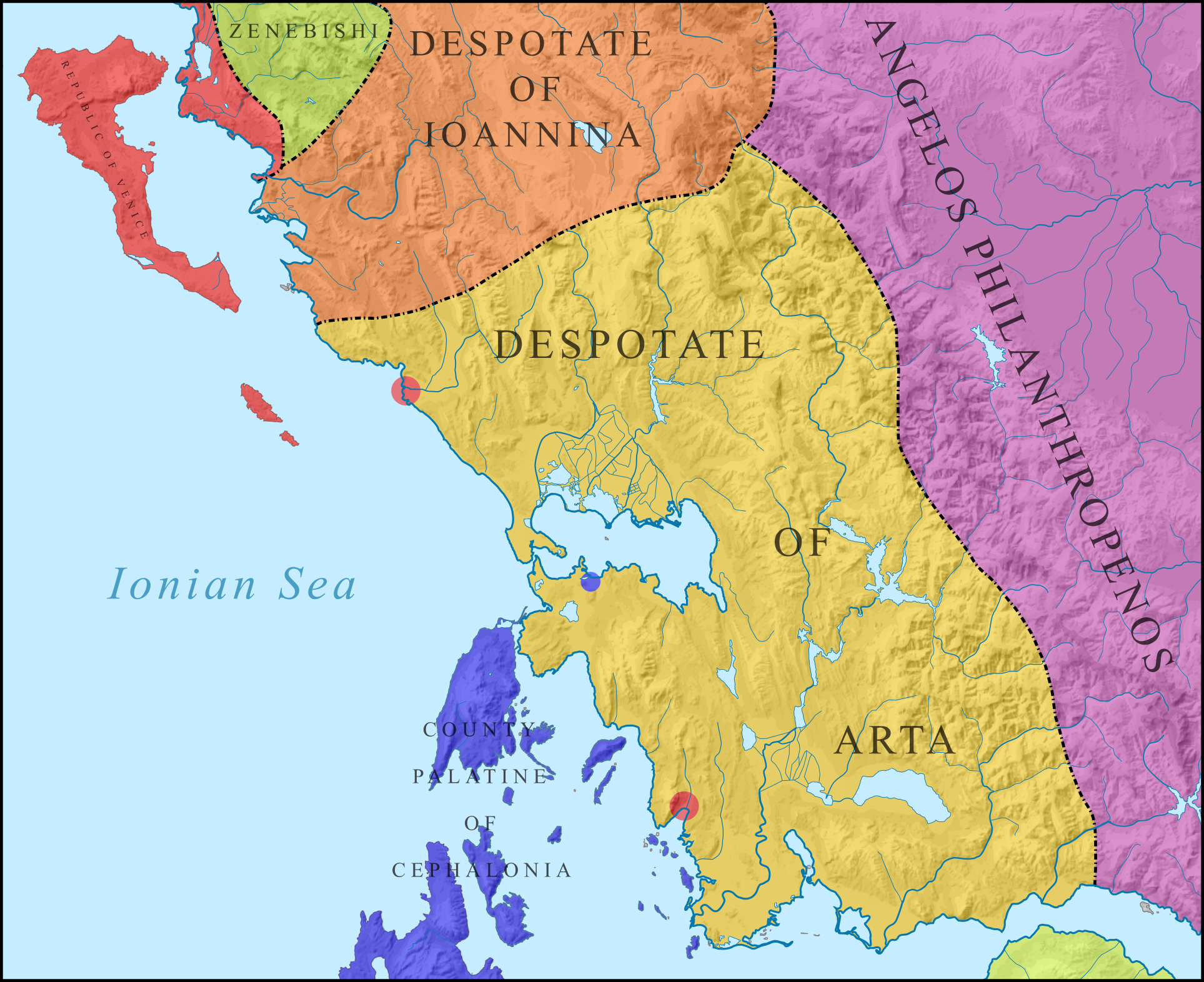
Despotate of Arta, c. 1390

Gjin Bua Shpata (sometimes anglicized as John Spata) (fl. 1358 – 29 October 1399) was an Albanian ruler of the despotate of Arta in Western Greece with the title of Despot. Together with Pjetër Losha, he led raids into Epirus, Acarnania and Aetolia in 1358. As a victor in the battle of Achelous, he was recognized in early 1360s as a Despot of Aetolia and Acarnania by Simeon Uroš Nemanjić, who ruled from Thessaly as a self-proclaimed "Emperor of Greeks, Serbs, and Albanians". He also ruled over Naupactus (1378–1399) and inherited Arta (1370s–1399) from Peter Losha. He was born sometime in the first half of the 14th century in Epirus, as his father was a ruler in the region.

== Name ==
His name Gjin, a common Albanian given name. The word spata, in Albanian shpatë, pl. shpata, 'sword'. Hammond thus believes that he was called "John the Sword". Spatha being a type of Roman sword.

== Life ==
Gjin was born in the first half of the 14th century. His father was Pjetër Bua, an Albanian noble, whilst his mother remains unknown.

=== Early Reign ===
In 1358, some Albanian commanders overran Epirus, Acarnania and Aetolia, and subsequently established two principalities under their leaders, Shpata and Pjetër Losha.

Nikephoros II Orsini launched a campaign against the invading Albanians, and also faced with the threat of Radoslav Hlapen to the north, he negotiated with Simeon Uroš, presumably to prevent Simeon's Albanian allies from supporting the Albanians in Epirus. The negotiations were thwarted by Nikephoros' death fighting the Albanians at Acheloos (1359).

In 1360, Simeon Uroš, the titular Serbian Emperor, in an attempt to avoid conflict with the Albanians and as an acknowledgement of their military strength decided to leave the areas of Arta and Aetolia to Shpata and Losha.

=== Conflict with the Knights Hospitallers ===
In 1376 or 1377, Shpata conquered Nafpaktos; by this time he controlled Arta and much of southern Epirus and Acarnania. The Achaean Knights Hospitallers of Juan Fernández de Heredia began their invasion of Epirus, moving onto Shpata, capturing Nafpaktos, and then Vonitsa in Acarnania (April 1378). However, Shpata managed to defeat and capture Heredia as a hostage, ending their campaign; he was again master of Nafpaktos by 1380. In May 1379, Shpata again devastated the countryside of Ioannina.

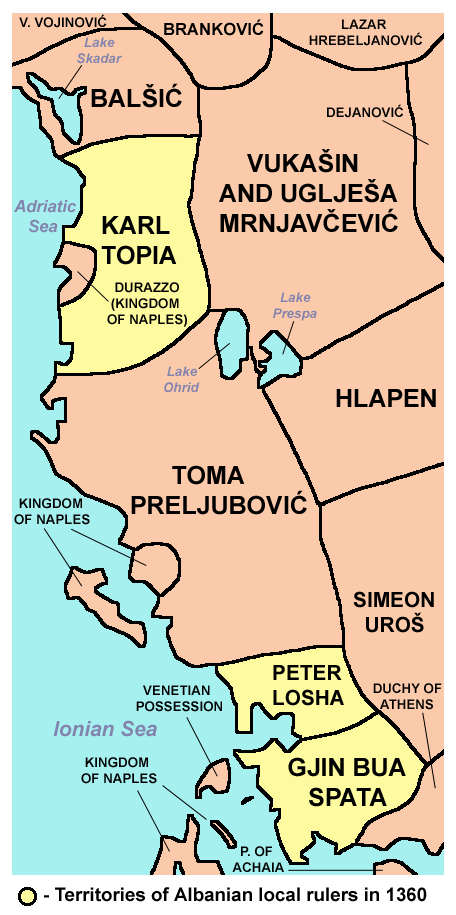
Map detail of magnate provinces in c. 1360.

=== Conflict with Thomas Preljubović ===
The Despot of Ioannina, Thomas Preljubović, had betrothed his daughter to Losha's son in 1370, satisfying the Albanians and ending the conflict between them. In 1374, however, Pjetër Losha died of the plague in Arta, after which Shpata took the city. At this time he was not bound by agreement to Thomas, and so he laid siege to Ioannina and ravaged the countryside by defeating the forces of Preljubović. Thomas brought peace when he betrothed his sister Helena to Shpata the following year. Attacks on Ioannina continued, however, by the Malakasioi, who didn't succeed to take Ioannina in 1377 and 1379. This tribe acted independently and nor under the order of Shpata.

In 1376 or 1377, Shpata conquered Nafpaktos; by this time he controlled Arta and much of southern Epirus and Acarnania. The Achaean Knights Hospitallers of Juan Fernández de Heredia began their invasion of Epirus, moving onto Shpata, capturing Nafpaktos, and then Vonitsa in Acarnania (April 1378). However, Shpata managed to defeat and capture Heredia as a hostage, ending their campaign; he was again master of Nafpaktos by 1380. In May 1379, Shpata again devastated the countryside of Ioannina.

In 1380, Thomas made an offensive with the help of Turks reaching up to the upper Kalamas River, where however, the Albanians, in particular, the tribe of Mazaraki held their defensive position and defeated Thomas again.

In 1384 Thomas Preljubović was killed by some of his bodyguards. Gjin Bua Shpata attacked Ioannina but was unsuccessful in cracking the defense set up by Esau de' Buondelmonti. The two made peace but soon returned to the conflict. In 1386, Esau gained Ottoman military help. The Ottomans were, after the Battle of Kosovo (1389), unable to assist Esau, thus, the Albanians seized the opportunity and raided the environs of Ioannina in the summer by defeating Esau and forcing him to stay inside the city. The Malakasioi then raided into the territory, after which they concluded alliance with Shpata. Esau then allied himself with the caesar of Thessaly (either Alexios Angelos or Manuel), who defeated the Albanians, presumably the Malakasioi, later that year, but not Shpata.

=== Later life and death ===
In January 1396, Esau married Shpata's only daughter, Irene. The marriage was part of a deal which the archons of Ioannina enforced on Esau in order to make peace with the Albanians.

Shpata died on 29 October 1399, under the continuous pressure of Tocco. Shpata's son would become the next despot of Arta and Angelokastron for the next decade.

== Legacy ==
The Albanian academic Gjergji Shuka distinguished the origin of some South Slavic (Jovan i divski starešina, Marko Kraljević i Đemo Brđanin, Jana i Detelin voyvoda) Albanian and legends and epic songs, such as Zuku Bajraktar, Dedalia dhe Katallani, Çika e plakut Emin agë vret në duel Baloze Delinë, and in the poem regarding Shpata and the battle of Arta in 1378. The two enemies of Gjon, Juan Fernández de Heredia and queen Joanna I of Naples, are remembered in Balkan collective memory.

== Possessions ==
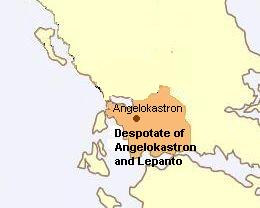
Possessions of Shpata.

- Aetolia (Early 1360s–?)
- Angelokastron (?–1399)
- Acheloos (?–1399)
- Nafpaktos or "Lepanto" (1377–78; 1380–?)
- Arta (1375–99)

== Family ==
His genealogical tree is not well documented. It was first outlined by Karl Hopf in his Chroniques Greco-Romanes (p. 531) and by K. Sathas in the 19th century but a newer study finds that those works have many mistakes and gaps. Hopf's genealogy of the Shpata family is "altogether inaccurate". According to it, his father was Pietro, the lord of Angelokastron and Delvina (1354) during the reign of Serbian emperor Stefan Dušan (r. 1331–55). It is known that Shpata had a brother, Skurra Bua Shpata.

G. Schiró studied the genealogy of Shpata based on the original sources, i.e. the "Chronicle of Ioannina" and the "Chronicle of Tocco", but also on the Venetian archives. He proposed that Pietro Bua had not only three sons but four and that John had only daughters. His daughter Irene married three times. He believes that the family was extinct with the death of Jakob in 1416. Other people, mainly condottieri, with the name "Bua" are not blood relatives of this family but this name was used by many as first name since it became famous. Gjin Bua Shpata's first name was Bua, while the name Spata appears to him as a second name.

He was married to a woman who is unknown in the historical record. His daughter, Irene was married (before April 1381 ) to a Marchesano of Naples, Morean baron, baillie of Achaea and Esau de' Buondelmonti in 1396. Esau was the Despot of Ioannina. Another unnamed daughter was married to Gjon Zenebishi.

Among his grandchildren were brothers Muriq Shpata and Jakob Bua Shpata, who claimed to have been sons of Eirene.

== See also ==
- Albanian principalities
- History of Albania

== Sources ==
- Fine, John V. A. (1994) [1987]. The Late Medieval Balkans: A Critical Survey from the Late Twelfth Century to the Ottoman Conquest. Ann Arbor, Michigan: University of Michigan Press. ISBN 978-0-472-10079-8.
- Hammond, Nicholas Geoffrey Lemprière (1976). Migrations and invasions in Greece and adjacent areas. Noyes Press. ISBN 978-0-8155-5047-1.
- Istituto di studi bizantini e neoellenici (1968). Rivista di studi bizantini e neoellenici. Vol. 5–9, 15–19. Istituto di studi bizantini e neoellenici, Università di Roma.
- Nicol, Donald MacGillivray (1984). The Despotate of Epiros 1267–1479: A Contribution to the History of Greece in the Middle Ages. Cambridge University Press. ISBN 978-0-521-13089-9.
- Orel, Vladimir (1998). Albanian etymological dictionary. Brill. ISBN 9004110240.
- Sansaridou-Hendrickx, Thekla (2017). "The Albanians in the Chronicle(s) of Ioannina: An Anthropological Approach". Acta Patristica et Byzantina. 21 (2): 287–306. doi:10.1080/10226486.2010.11879131. S2CID 163742869.

Preceded by Post created	Despot of Angelokastron and Lepanto; 1359–1374	Succeeded by Post abolished
Preceded by Peter Losha	Despot of Arta; 1374–1399	Succeeded by Sgouros Spata
