= Simeon Uroš =

Emperor of Serbs and Greeks

- Despot of Epirus; Emperor of Serbs and Greeks (pretender)
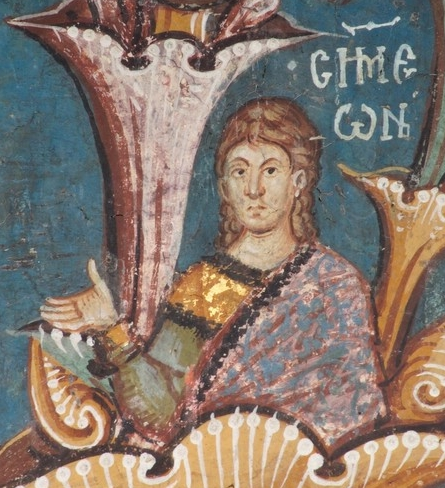
- Fresco from 1346, Visoki Dečani

Ruler of Epirus
- Reign: 1359–1366
- Predecessor: Nikephoros II Orsini
- Successor: Thomas Preljubović

Ruler of Thessaly
- Reign: 1360–1370
- Predecessor: Nikephoros II Orsini
- Successor: John Uroš
- Born: c. 1326; Kingdom of Serbia
- Died: 1370
- Spouse: Thomais Orsini
- Issue: John Uroš; Stephen Uroš; Maria Angelina
- Dynasty: Nemanjić
- Father: Stephen Uroš III
- Mother: Maria Palaiologina
- Religion: Eastern Orthodoxy

Simeon Uroš (Serbian Cyrillic: Симеон Урош, Greek: Συμεών Ούρεσης; c. 1326–1370), nicknamed Siniša (Синиша), was a self-proclaimed Emperor of Serbs and Greeks, from 1356 to 1370. He was son of Serbian King Stephen Uroš III and Byzantine Princess Maria Palaiologina. Initially, he was awarded the title of despot in 1346, and appointed governor of southern Epirus and Acarnania in 1347 by his half-brother, Serbian Emperor Stephen Dušan. After Dušan's death in 1355, the Serbian throne passed to Dušan's son Stephen Uroš V, but despot Simeon decided to seize the opportunity in order to impose himself as co-ruler and lord of all southern provinces of the Serbian Empire. That led him to conflict with his nephew in 1356, when Simeon started to expand his control in southern regions of the Empire, trying to take Thessaly and Macedonia. He proclaimed himself Emperor of the Serbs and Greeks, creating a separate state, centered in regions of Thessaly and Epirus, where he ruled until his death in 1370. He was succeeded by his son Jovan Uroš.

== Early life ==
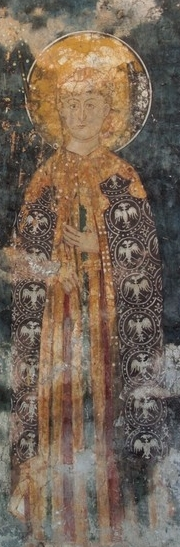
Simeon in his younger years, Visoki Dečani.

Simeon Uroš was the son of King Stephen Uroš III (r. 1322–1331) by his second wife, Maria Palaiologina, the daughter of the Byzantine prince and rebel John Palaiologos who had joined Stephen's raids in Macedonia in 1326, the same year Simeon Uroš was born. His older, half-brother, Dušan was crowned "Young king" (designated heir) in 1322 during the crowning of their father.

== Stephen Dušan's reign ==
Stephen Dušan was crowned King in September 1331, after months of civil war. Dušan exploited the Byzantine civil war and made major gains beginning in 1342. Having all of Macedonia under his rule, Stephen Dušan was proclaimed "Emperor of Serbs and Greeks" in September 1345, then crowned as such in April 1346. Dušan, as an emperor, granted Byzantine titles upon his magnates. Simeon Uroš and Jovan Asen were given the despot title, while others were given the sebastokrator and kesar titles.

With the Serbian conquest of Epirus, Acarnania and Thessaly by 1348, Simeon Uroš was given the governorship of Epirus and Thessaly. Simeon Uroš consolidated his position with the local aristocracy by marrying Thomais Orsini, the daughter of the former ruler of Epirus, John II Orsini.

== Claim to the Serbian throne and independence ==
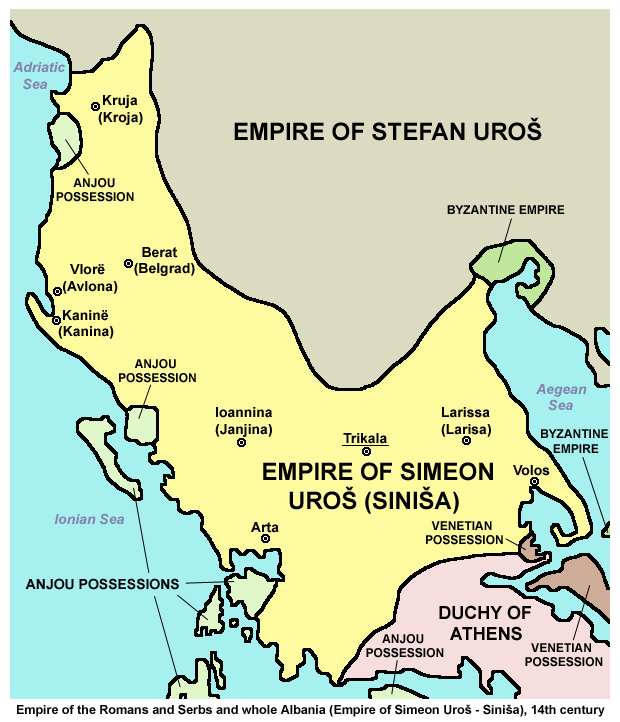
Simeon's empire.

Simeon Uroš's relatively uneventful governorship was interrupted when, shortly after Dušan's death in 1355, his brother-in-law Nikephoros II Orsini, the deposed ruler of Epirus, reappeared in Greece and gained the support of the nobility in Thessaly and Epirus. In 1356 Nikephoros entered Epirus and forced Simeon Uroš to flee to Kastoria. There Simeon proclaimed himself "Emperor of Serbs and Greeks" in rivalry with his nephew Stephen Uroš V.

Although he was supported by some important magnates like Jovan (the brother of Stephen Dušan's widow), Simeon was rejected by the nobility of the Serbian lands and Macedonia. After he was forced to retreat from his attempt to invade Zeta (modern Montenegro) in 1358, Simeon Uroš gave up hope of asserting himself in Serbia. The next year, however, Nikephoros II Orsini was killed in a skirmish against Albanian clans, opening an opportunity for Simeon Uroš. Consequently, he rapidly swept into Thessaly and was acknowledged as its ruler in 1359. He then invaded Epirus, where the towns, harried by the Albanian clans who had taken over the countryside, also recognized his authority. He also used his maternal maiden name, Palaiologos (Παλαιολόγος), during his rule.

While Simeon Uroš was in Epirus, Radoslav Hlapen of Vodena (Edessa) attempted to seize Thessaly on behalf of his stepson Thomas Preljubović. Simeon Uroš was forced to cut his losses by recognizing Radoslav Hlapen's conquests, turning over Kastoria to him, and marrying his daughter Maria to Thomas. Hlapen recognized Simeon Uroš's suzerainty in at least some of these lands and provided a buffer between him and the Serbian nobles to the north. Simeon Uroš established himself in Trikala in Thessaly, and spent the remaining decade of his reign in relative peace. He soon recognized two of the Albanian leaders in Epirus, John Spata and Peter Losha, as despotes of Arta and Angelokastron. In 1366 he turned over Ioannina, his last major possession in Epirus, to his son-in-law Thomas, who ruled there as a vassal despot.

In Trikala, Simeon Uroš presided over a court including Byzantine, Serbian, and Albanian nobles, but he showed preference for the Byzantine relatives of his wife. He also founded and generously endowed the monasteries of Meteora. He died in 1370.

== Family ==
By his marriage to Thomais Orsini, Simeon Uroš had three children:

- John Uroš, who succeeded as Serbian tsar and ruler of Thessaly.
- Stephen Uroš, prince of Pharsalos, who married a daughter of Francis Zorzi. Previously, arrangements had been made to marry him to Maria Fadrique, lady of Salona, but the negotiations were interrupted due to the disapproval of Peter IV of Aragon.
- Maria Angelina, who married Thomas Preljubović, who succeeded as ruler of Epirus.

== Sources ==
- Ćirković, Sima (2004). The Serbs. Malden: Blackwell Publishing. ISBN 9781405142915.
- Ferjančić, Božidar (1974). Тесалија у XIII и XIV веку [Thessaly in the 13th and 14th Centuries] (in Serbian). Belgrade: Византолошког институт САНУ.
- Fine, John V. A. (1994) [1987]. The Late Medieval Balkans: A Critical Survey from the Late Twelfth Century to the Ottoman Conquest. Ann Arbor, Michigan: University of Michigan Press. ISBN 978-0-472-10079-8.
- Kazhdan, Alexander, ed. (1991). The Oxford Dictionary of Byzantium. Oxford and New York: Oxford University Press. ISBN 0-19-504652-8.
- Miller, William (1908). The Latins in the Levant: A History of Frankish Greece (1204–1566). London: John Murray.
- Nicol, Donald M. (1993) [1972]. The Last Centuries of Byzantium, 1261–1453 (Second ed.). Cambridge: Cambridge University Press. ISBN 978-0-521-43991-6.
- Nicol, Donald M. (1984). The Despotate of Epiros, 1267–1479: A Contribution to the History of Greece in the Middle Ages. Cambridge: Cambridge University Press. ISBN 978-0-521-13089-9.
- Ostrogorsky, George (1956). History of the Byzantine State. Oxford: Basil Blackwell.
- Soulis, George Christos (1984). The Serbs and Byzantium during the reign of Tsar Stephen Dušan (1331–1355) and his successors. Washington: Dumbarton Oaks Library and Collection. ISBN 9780884021377.
- Zečević, Nada (2014). The Tocco of the Greek Realm: Nobility, Power and Migration in Latin Greece (14th–15th centuries). Belgrade: Makart. ISBN 9788691944100.

Regnal titles
Preceded by Nikephoros II	Ruler of Epirus; 1359–1366	Succeeded by Thomas II
Preceded by Nikephoros II	Ruler of Thessaly; 1359–1370	Succeeded by John Uroš
Political offices
Preceded by Nikephoros II	Governor of Epirus; Under Stephen Uroš V of Serbia; 1348–1356	Succeeded by Nikephoros II
