= Despotate of Arta =

Former state

Despotate of Arta Despotati i Artës (Albanian) Δεσποτάτο της Άρτας (Greek)
- 1359–1416
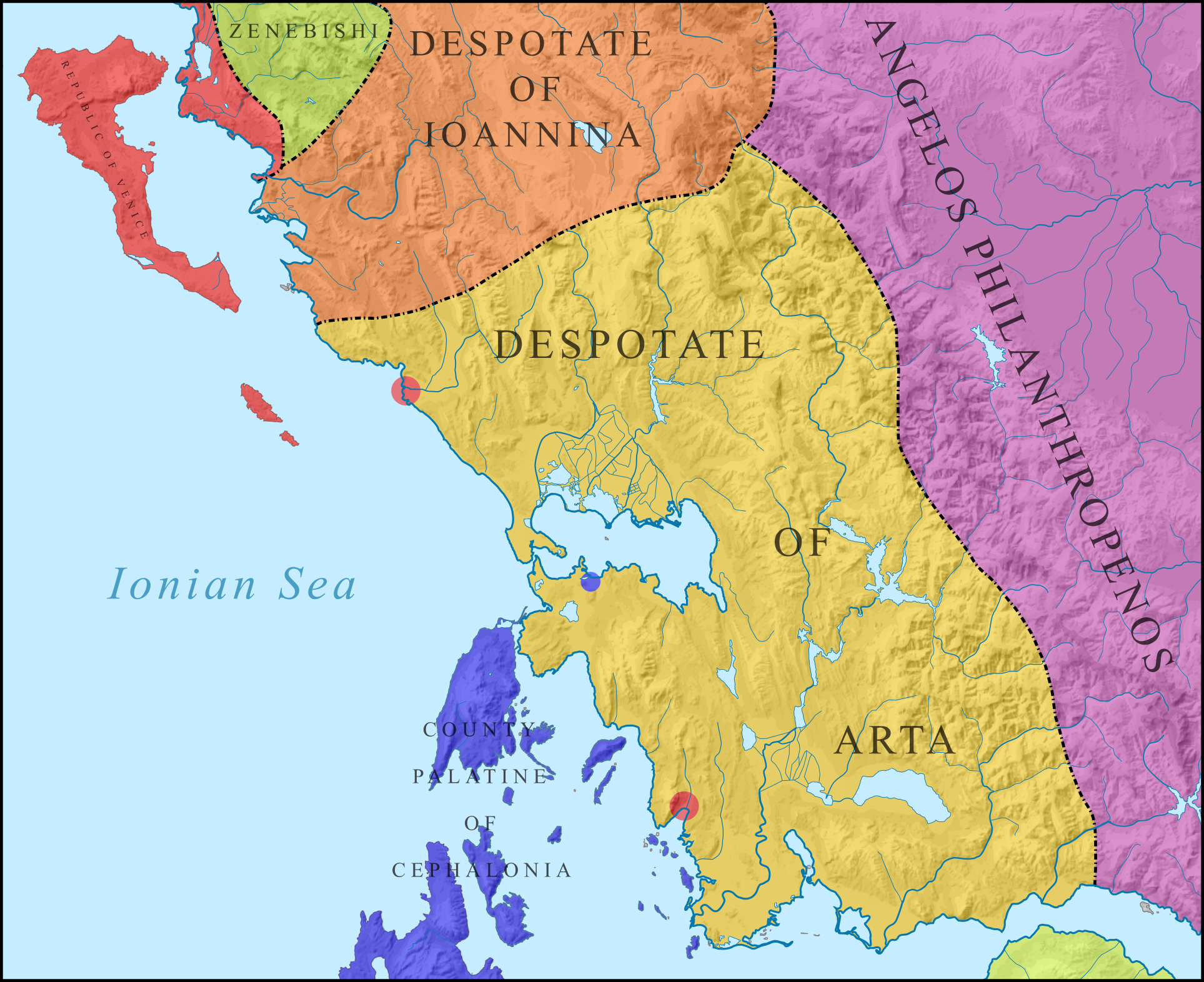
- Map of the Despotate of Arta in 1390
- Status: Despotate
- Capital: Arta
- Common languages: Albanian; Greek
- Religion: Eastern Orthodoxy
- Despot/Lord
  - 1360–1374: Pjetër Losha
  - 1374–1399: Gjin Bua Shpata
  - 1399–1403: Sgouros Shpata
  - 1403–1415: Muriq Shpata
  - 1415–1416: Yaqub Shpata
- Historical era: Medieval
  - Established: April 1359
  - Unified with Angelokastron and Lepanto: 1374
  - Disestablished: 4 October 1416
Preceded by	Succeeded by
Despotate of Epirus; Despotate of Angelokastron and Lepanto	Despotate of Epirus
- Today part of: Greece

The Despotate of Arta (Albanian: Despotati i Artës; Greek: Δεσποτάτο της Άρτας) was a despotate established by Albanian rulers during the 14th century, after the defeat of the local Despot of Epirus, Nikephoros II Orsini, by Albanian tribesmen in the Battle of Achelous in 1359. The Despotate ceased to exist in 1416, when it passed to Carlo I Tocco.

== History ==
=== Creation ===
In the late spring of 1359, Nikephoros II Orsini, the last despot of Epirus of the Orsini dynasty, fought against the Albanians near river Acheloos, Aetolia. The Albanians won the battle under Karl Thopia and managed to create two new states in the southern territories of the Despotate of Epirus. Because a number of Albanian lords actively supported the successful Serbian campaign in Thessaly and Epirus, the Serbian self-proclaimed Emperor of Serbs and Greeks, Simeon Uroš, granted them specific regions and offered them the Byzantine title of despotes in order to secure their loyalty.

By the late 1360s, two Albanian principalities had emerged: the first with its capital in Arta under Pjetër Losha, and the second, centered in Angelokastron, under Gjin Bua Shpata. After the death of Pjetër Losha in 1374, the Albanian despotates of Arta and Angelocastron were united under the rule of Gjin Bua Shpata.

On April 1378 the Grand Master of the Knights Hospitaller, Juan Fernández de Heredia set about to take Arta but failed and was captured in battle by Gjin Bua Shpata. Herendia was sold by Shpata to the Ottoman Turks for a huge prize. Thomas II Preljubović, the Despot of Epirus offered valuable help during the battle, however this alliance didn't last for long.

The territory of this despotate at its greatest extent (1374–1403) was from the Corinth Gulf to Acheron River in the North, neighboring with the Principality of Gjirokastër of Gjon Zenebishi, another state created in the area of the Despotate of Epirus. The Despotate of Epirus managed to control in this period only the eastern part of Epirus, with its capital in Ioannina. During this period the Despot of Epirus Thomas II Preljubović was in an open conflict with Gjin Shpata. In 1375, Gjin Bua Shpata started an offensive in Ioannina, but he could not invade the city. Although Shpata married with Thomas' sister, Helena, their war did not stop.

=== Fall of the Despotate ===
After the death of Gjin Bua Shpata in 1399, the Despotate of Arta weakened continuously, and the Shpata family was involved in civil war. Among the animosities with the rulers of Ioannina Gjin's successor, Muriq Shpata, had to deal with the intentions of the Venetians and of Count Carlo I Tocco of Cefalonia. Meanwhile, Ottoman incursions were intensified as they were occasionally called by despot Esau de' Buondelmonti of the Despotate of Epirus. After the death of de' Buondelmonti in 1411, the throne was offered to his nephew, Carlo I Tocco. Even though his gain was accompanied by a great loss that the forces of Gjon Zenebishi's inflicted upon his army, he would later subject the leaders of southern Albania. In spite of Muriq's victory over Carlo in 1412, the Albanians failed to take Ioannina. On the contrary, not long after killing Muriq in battle in 1414–1415, Carlo advanced on Arta. In 1416, he defeated Jakob Bua Shpata and conquered Arta thus annexing the Despotate.

== Local legacy ==
The city of Arta was relatively unknown during the period of the Albanian rule (1358–1416). Albanian leaders acquired legally Byzantine titles and tried to adopt Byzantine state structure. Although no architectural activity has been reported for this period, little seems to have changed in Arta and the Albanian and Greek population coexisted peacefully in the city.

== Monarchs ==
Picture	^{Title}Name	Reign	Notes
	^{Despot} Pjetër Losha	1360–1374	The first ever ruler of the Despotate of Arta. Pjetër reigned during the Losha Dynasty.
	^{Despot} Gjin Bua Shpata	1374–1399	Gjin started the Shpata Dynasty of the Despotate. He united the Albanian Despotates of Arta and Angelocastron after the death of Pjetër Losha.
	^{Lord of Arta} Skurra Bua Shpata	1399–1403	Brother of Gjin Bua Shpata.
	^{Lord of Arta} Muriq Shpata	1403–1415	Grandson of Gjin Bua Shpata and had one brother Jakob Bua Shpata.
	^{Lord of Arta} Jakob Bua Shpata	1415–1416	The last ruler of the Despotate of Arta.

== See also ==
- Albanian principalities
- History of Albania
