= Malakasioi =

Historical Albanian tribe

The Malakasi were a historical Albanian tribe in medieval Epirus, Thessaly and later southern Greece. Their name is a reference to their area of origin, Dangëllia (from Turkish Dağ-ili, older name "Malakasi") in southern Albania, centered around the village of Malakas, on the Western slope of mount Radomir. They appear in historical records as one of the Albanian tribes which raided and invaded Thessaly after 1318 and throughout the 14th century were active in the struggles of the Albanian Despotate of Arta against the Despotate of Epirus.

== Name ==
The primary historical sources for the Malakasi are the History of John VI Kantakouzenos written in second half of the 14th century and the Chronicle of the Tocco written in the early 15th century. In the History and the chronicle, the tribe is recorded as Malakasaioi. In Venetian registries of Albanian settlers in southern Greece, they are mentioned as Malacassi. Several waves of migrations from this region settled in southern Greece and Italy. As such as a surname, Malakasa was a typical Albanian surname of settlers who were invited mainly by the Venetians to settle in southern Greece, some of which later settled in Italy. Among them it is found in the surnames of the founders of the Arbëreshë communities of San Demetrio Corone and Palazzo Adriano in 1488.

== History ==
The Malakasi along with other Albanian tribes, the Bua and the Mesareti invaded Thessaly after 1318. According to Alain Ducellier they left their areas of origin in Albania due to social oppression and upheavals. N.G.L Hammond mentions overpopulation in Albania and underpopulation of mainland Greece as a contributing factor to the migrations. Byzantine emperor John VI Kantakouzenos in his History records them as one of the Albanian tribes which reached a truce with the Byzantine Empire in 1332-33. In the history of the medieval Despotate of Epirus, they appear as one of the tribes who supported the local Albanian leaders in their struggles to gain control of the region against the despotate. The Malakasi and the Mazaraki sieged the city of Ioannina in 1367-70 and again in 1374-75 under Pjetër Losha, who was their leader. Peace was concluded at the time, but in 1377 the Malakasi attacked again Ioannina but were defeated. In 1379, they were again among those who besieged the city. The Malakasi rebelled in 1389 against Esau de' Buondelmonti. Buondelmonti was an Ottoman vassal who relied on Ottoman support for his rule against the Albanians. As soon as Murad I died in 1389 in the battle of Kosovo, the Albanian in Epirus rose up against him. The Malakasi raided Esau's territories around Ioannina and Gjin Bua Shpata attacked the city. The Malakasi and Spata formed an alliance for a direct attack against the city. Esau concluded a pact with the Byzantine ruler of Thessaly. In the following battle, the Malakasi were defeated. In 1390, Esau secured Ottoman support again and a large Ottoman army under Evrenos came in Epirus to fight against the Albanian tribes, who were forced to withdraw in the mountainous areas. In 1396, a new anti-Ottoman pact was reached between Spata and Esau against the Ottomans, who were defeated. In 1411, Carlo I Tocco rose as lord of Ioannina and as recorded in the Chronicle one Stephanos Bouisavos who might be from the Malakasii received the title of protostrator, though most sources consider Bouisavos to be a Serb.

At the same time, they also began to settle in southern Greece. In Attica (Malakasa) and Elis, two distinct settlements were founded by them. The settlement in Elis corresponded to that of modern Elaionas and is recorded as Malaḳas in the Ottoman defter of 1460-3, covering much of the Peloponnese. The settlement itself had a total of 7 households and is noted as an Albanian community (cemā'at-i Arnavudān). They also figure in the Albanian refugees who founded San Demetrio Corone and Palazzo Adriano. In the Pindus mountains and the border between Thessaly and Epirus, there's a Malakasi and in Ottoman times a nahiya named Malakasi existed in the region. Its inhabitants were recorded in the 19th century as Aromanian-speaking. Their origins are disputed. Giuseppe Valentini supported the theory that they were descendants of the original Malakasi who had adopted Aromanian after centuries-long cohabitation with Aromanians. N. G. L. Hammond considered them to be probably a different tribe from the Albanian one, which descended in Thessaly in 1334 after the first Albanian incursions and was recorded by a similar name in historical records because they both came originally from the Mallakastër plain, which according to Hammond evidently has an Aromanian etymology with the meaning 'bad encampments'. Malakasi (Malakaş) is recorded in the Ottoman register of 1454-5 for the Sanjak of Tirhala as a settlement in the eponymous nahiya, and a timar of a certain Gjin Mazaraki and his brother Thodhor. The village had a total of 13 households, the majority of household heads bearing typical Albanian anthroponyms (e.g., Gjin Muzhaqi, Dhimo Murra, Leka Lavaniti) as well as general Christian names (e.g., Mihal Stefani, Jani Stefano).

== Bibliography ==
- Fine, John Van Antwerp (1994), The Late Medieval Balkans: A Critical Survey from the Late Twelfth Century to the Ottoman Conquest, University of Michigan Press, ISBN 978-0-472-08260-5
- Nicol, Donald MacGillivray (1984). The Despotate of Epiros, 1267-1479: A Contribution to the History of Greece in the Middle Ages. Cambridge University Press. ISBN 9780521261906.
- Nicholas Geoffrey Lemprière Hammond (1976). Migrations and invasions in Greece and adjacent areas. Noyes Press. ISBN 978-0-8155-5047-1.
- Valentini, Giuseppe (1956). Il diritto delle comunità nella tradizione giuridica albanese; generalità. Vallecchi.
- Sansaridou-Hendrickx, Thekla (2017). "The Albanians in the Chronicle(s) of Ioannina: An Anthropological Approach". Acta Patristica et Byzantina. 21 (2): 287–306. doi:10.1080/10226486.2010.11879131. S2CID 163742869.
- Asterios I. Kukudes (2003). The Vlachs: Metropolis and Diaspora. Zitros Publ. ISBN 978-960-7760-86-9.
- Hammond, Nicholas (1987). Tom Winnifrith (ed.). The Vlachs: The History of a Balkan People. Duckworth. p. 120. ISBN 978-0-7156-2135-6.
- Trapp, Erich; Beyer, Hans-Veit; Walther, Rainer; Sturm-Schnabl, Katja; Kislinger, Ewald; Leontiadis, Ioannis; Kaplaneres, Sokrates (1976–1996). Prosopographisches Lexikon der Palaiologenzeit (in German). Vienna: Verlag der Österreichischen Akademie der Wissenschaften. ISBN 3-7001-3003-1.
