= Nikephoros II Orsini =

Ruler of Epirus (1335–1338, 1356–1359)

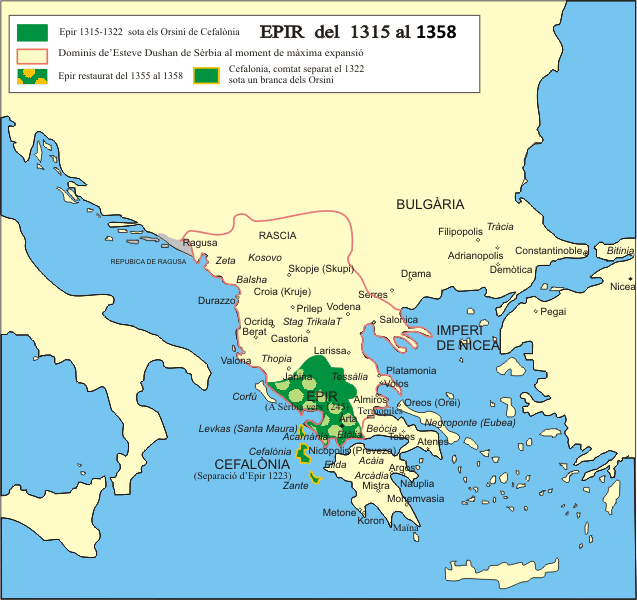

Nikephoros II Orsini Doukas (Greek: Νικηφόρος Β΄ Δούκας, Nikēphoros II Doukas), was the ruler of Epirus from 1335 to 1338 and from 1356 until his death in 1359.

== Life ==
Nikephoros was the son of John Orsini of Epirus and Anna Palaiologina. When his mother allegedly poisoned his father in 1335, Nikephoros II succeeded as a 7-year-old child. His mother Anna assumed the regency for her young son but failed to allay the enmity of the Byzantine Emperor Andronikos III Palaiologos, who invaded and annexed the Epirote part of Thessaly in 1336 and advanced on Ioannina. The Albanians took advantage of conflict to the south to raid the Byzantine possessions in the north, but were defeated by the emperor in 1337.

Andronikos summoned Anna to negotiate in 1338 but refused to accept her son as Byzantine vassal and installed his governors in Epirus. Keeping Anna as hostage, Andronikos arranged for the marriage between Nikephoros and Maria Kantakouzene, the daughter of his right-hand man John Kantakouzenos. However, the anti-Byzantine faction of the nobility smuggled Nikephoros out of the country and sent him to the court of Catherine II of Valois, the titular Empress of Constantinople, at Taranto, hoping to effect his restoration with Angevin help.

In 1338 Catherine crossed to the Peloponnese to attend to her interests there, bringing Nikephoros with her. At Catherine's instigation the Epirotes rebelled in Arta on behalf of Nikephoros in late 1338: the rebels seized Arta and the Byzantine governor, Theodore Synadenos, and Nikephoros was crossed over into Epirus. However, Andronikos III and John Kantakouzenos swiftly subdued the rebellion and besieged Nikephoros in Thomokastron. Assuring his personal safety, John Kantakouzenos persuaded the garrison to surrender. Nikephoros was duly married to Maria Kantakouzene and was honored with the title of panhypersebastos. Taken to Constantinople, Nikephoros remained attached to the household of Kantakouzenos during the Byzantine civil war of 1341–1347. When his father-in-law succeeded in asserting himself as Emperor John VI in 1347, Nikephoros was given the higher rank of despotes. From 1351 he was entrusted with governing Ainos and the cities along the Hellespont.

In late 1355, taking advantage of the renewal of the Byzantine civil war and the death of Emperor (tsar) Stefan Uroš IV Dušan of Serbia, who had conquered Epirus in the late 1340s, Nikephoros returned to Greece and rallied support. Taking advantage of the anarchy caused by the death of the Serbian governor of Thessaly, Nikephoros took over the region in Spring 1356, and advanced on Epirus. He chased out Dušan's brother Simeon Uroš (who had married Nikephoros' sister Thomais) from Arta and asserted his control over the cities of the region.

The countryside, however, had been overrun by the Albanian clans and was effectively impossible to control. To strengthen his position and avert a Serbian reaction, Nikephoros set aside his wife Maria Kantakouzene and prepared to marry Theodora of Bulgaria, the sister of Dušan's widow Helena, who governed Serbia for her son. However, Maria was popular and her husband was forced to recall her by the Epirote nobility. Nikephoros also entered into negotiations with his brother-in-law Simeon Uroš. Soon after recalling his wife, Nikephoros was killed in 1359 while fighting against the Albanians in the Battle of Achelous in Aetolia.

== Family ==
From his marriage to Maria Kantakouzene, Nikephoros II may have had at least one son:

- Manuel, who may be identical to Antony Kantakouzenos, a monk at Meteora in 1404.

Preceded by John II Orsini	Ruler of Epirus; 1335–1340	Succeeded by John Angelos as governor for the Byzantine Empire
Preceded by Gregory Preljub as governor for the Serbian Empire	Ruler of Thessaly and Epirus; 1356–1359	Succeeded by Simeon Uroš
