= Angelokastro, Aetolia-Acarnania =

Angelokastro Αγγελόκαστρο
- Municipal unit
- Location within the regional unit

- Location within Greece
- Coordinates: 38°34′N 21°18′E
- Country: Greece
- Administrative region: West Greece
- Regional unit: Aetolia-Acarnania
- Municipality: Agrinio

Area
  - Municipal unit: 55.73 km^{2} (21.52 sq mi)

Population (2021)
  - Municipal unit: 1,661
  - Municipal unit density: 29.80/km^{2} (77.19/sq mi)
  - Community: 1,099
- Time zone: UTC+2 (EET)
  - Summer (DST): UTC+3 (EEST)
- Postal code: 304 00
- Area code: 26410

Angelokastro (Greek: Αγγελόκαστρο) is a village and a former municipality in Aetolia-Acarnania, West Greece, Greece. Since the 2011 local government reform it is part of the municipality Agrinio, of which it is a municipal unit. The municipal unit has an area of 55.726 km^{2}.

== Sources ==
- Fine, John Van Antwerp Jr. (1994) [1987]. The Late Medieval Balkans: A Critical Survey from the Late Twelfth Century to the Ottoman Conquest. Ann Arbor, Michigan: University of Michigan Press.
- Zečević, Nada (2014). The Tocco of the Greek Realm: Nobility, Power and Migration in Latin Greece (14th-15th centuries). Belgrade: Makart.
