= List of princesses of Serbia =

This is a list of princesses of Serbia, that is, daughter of Serbian monarchs. It does not include princesses of Yugoslavia.

== Middle Ages ==
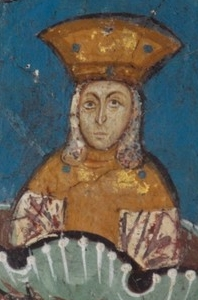
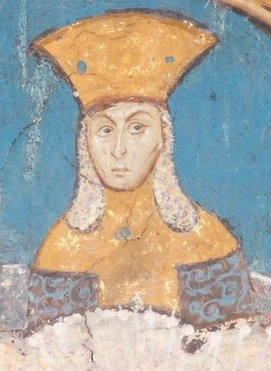
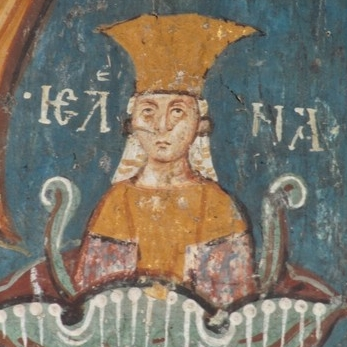
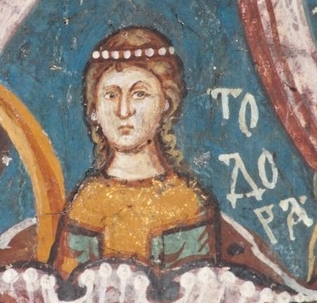
Brnjača · Zorica · Jelena · Teodora
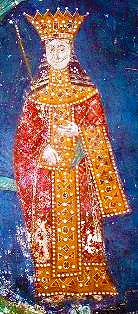
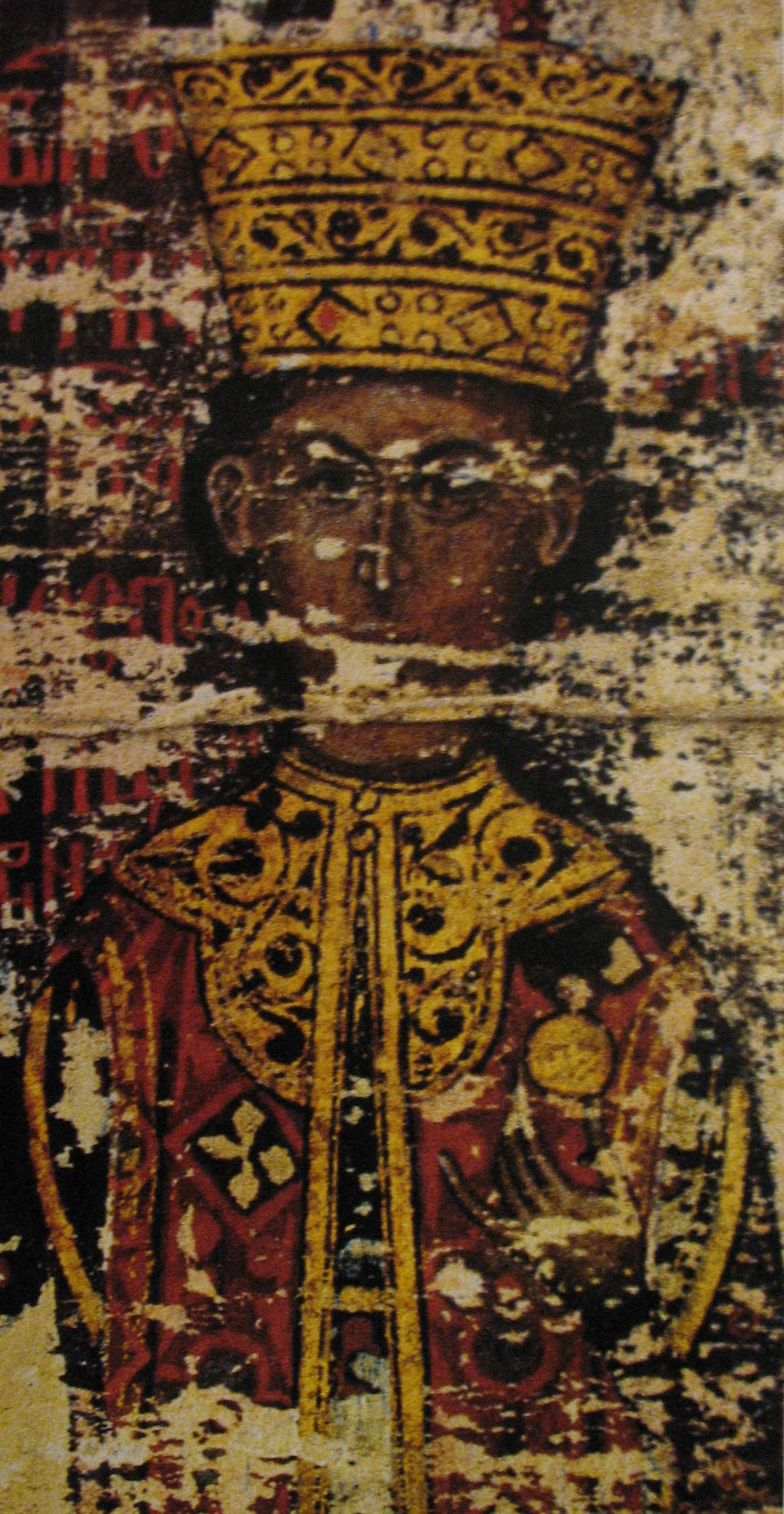
Left: Ana-Neda, Empress consort of Bulgaria
Right: Mara Branković, Valide Hatun and consort of the Ottoman sultan

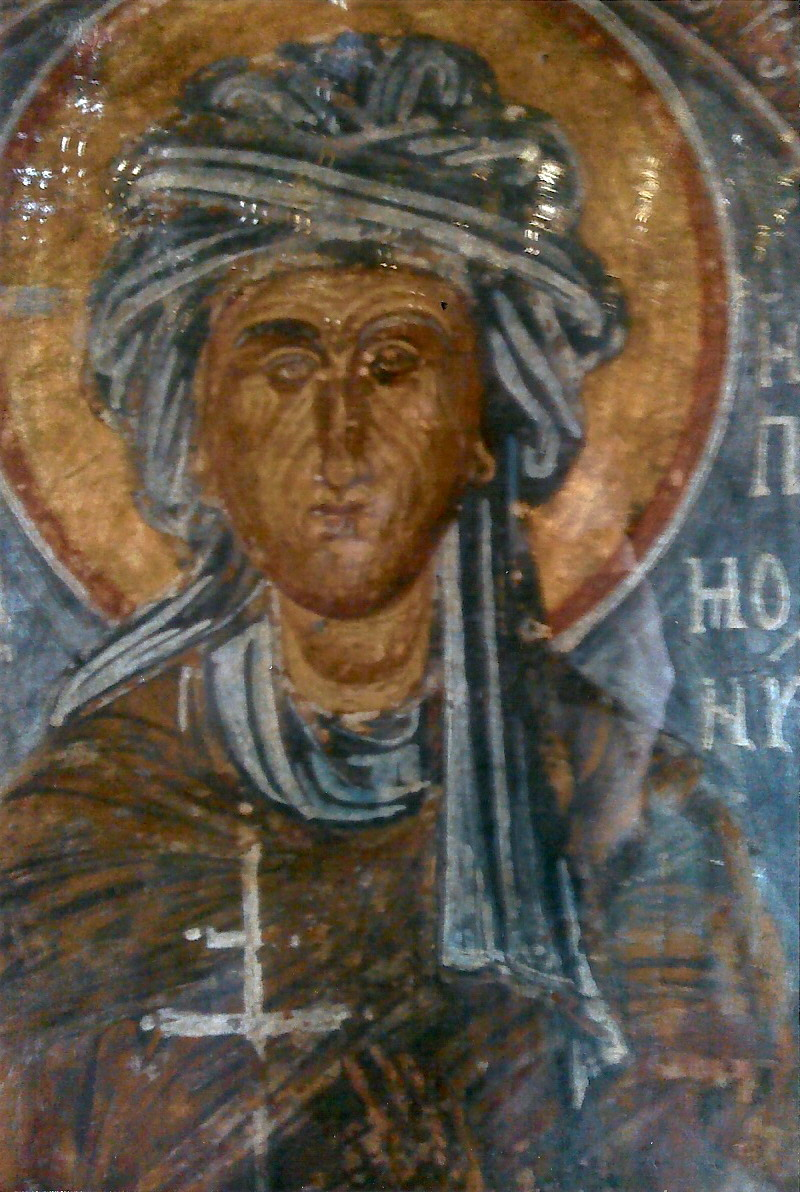
Helena, Empress consort of Byzantium

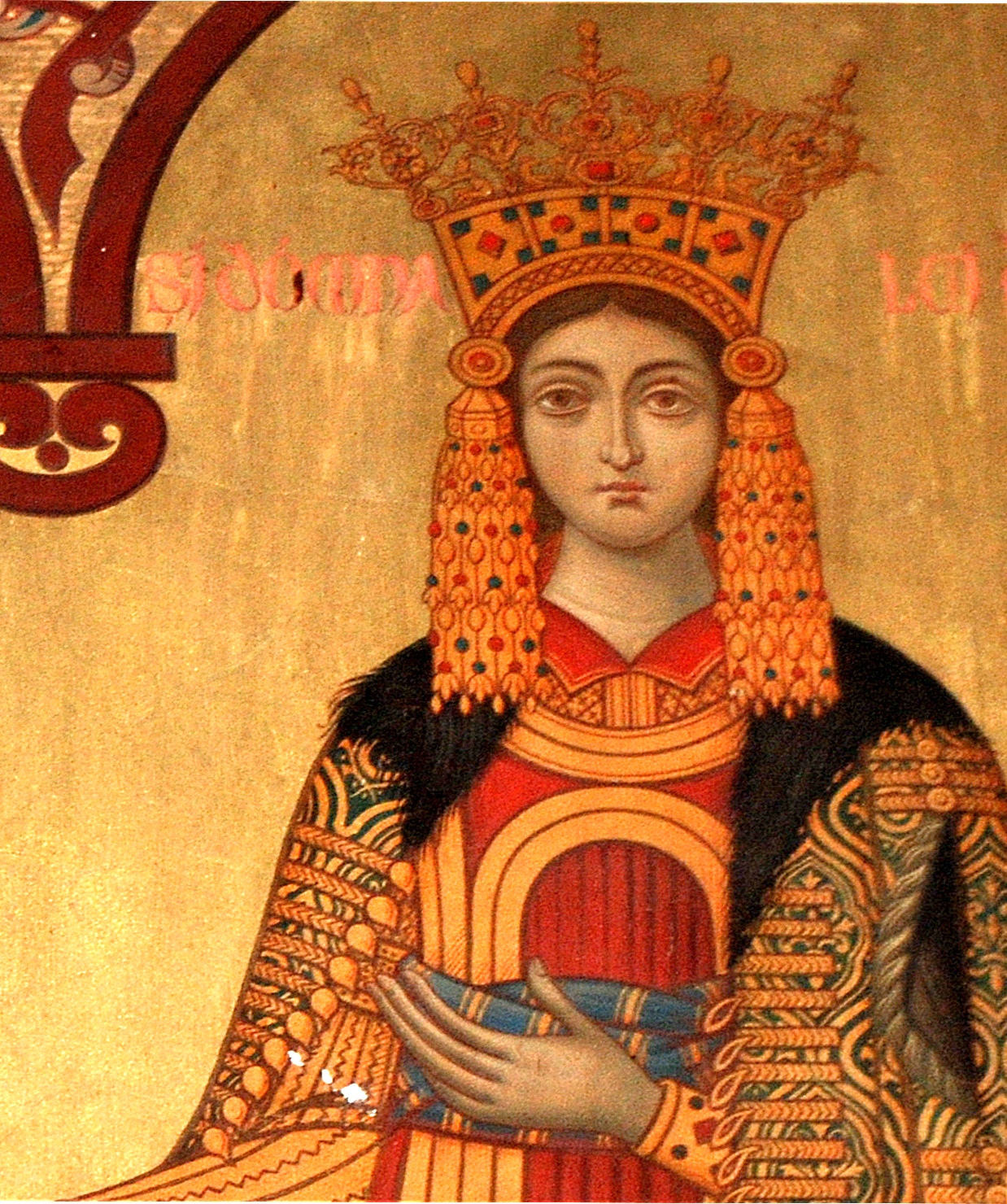
Milica, Princess consort of Wallachia

Princess	Parentage	Lifespan	Occupation
Unnamed daughter	Vlastimir	fl. 847	Spouse of Travunian župan Krajina Belojević
Unnamed daughter	Časlav	fl. 950	(possibly legendary)
Unnamed daughter	Mihailo I and Monomachina	fl. 1089	
Jelena	Uroš I and Anna Diogenissa	b. after 1109–after 1146	Spouse of Hungarian king Béla II
Maria	Uroš I and Anna Diogenissa	fl. 1134–d. 1189	Spouse of Bohemian prince Conrad II
"Banovna"	Beloš	fl. 1150	Spouse of Rus prince Vladimir Mstislavich
Jefimija	Stefan Nemanja and Ana	fl. before 1225	First spouse of Byzantine nobleman Manuel Doukas
Unnamed daughter	Stefan Nemanja and Ana	fl. before 1257	First spouse of Bulgarian nobleman Tihomir
Elena-Evgenia	Stefan Nemanja and Ana	fl. 1183–96	Second spouse of Bulgarian emperor Ivan Asen I
Komnena	Stefan the First-Crowned and Eudokia Angelina	fl. 1208–15	Spouse of Albanian nobleman Dimitri Progoni (1st); Greek–Albanian Gregory Kamonas (2nd)
Unnamed daughter	Stefan the First-Crowned		
Unnamed daughter	Stefan Vladislav and Beloslava Asen	fl. 1254	Spouse of Croat–Hungarian nobleman Đuro Kačić
Brnjača	Stefan Uroš I and Helen	ca. 1253–fl. 1264	Unmarried, nun
Elizabeth	Stefan Dragutin and Catherine Árpád	ca. 1270–1331	Spouse of Bosnian ban Stephen I
Ana-Neda	Stefan Milutin and Ana Terter	fl. 1323–24	Spouse of Bulgarian emperor Michael Shishman, nun
Zorica	Stefan Milutin and Elizabeth Árpád	fl. 1308	
Jelena	Stefan Dečanski and Maria Palaiologina	fl. 1345–55	Spouse of Croatian magnate Mladen III Šubić
Teodora-Evdokija	Stefan Dečanski and Maria Palaiologina	1330–fl. 1381	Spouse of Serbian magnate Dejan
Teodora	Stefan Dušan and Helena Sratsimir	fl.1351–d. 1352 or 1354	Consort of Ottoman sultan Orhan
Jerina	Stefan Dušan and Helena Sratsimir	fl. 1355	Spouse of Serbian magnate Preljub (1st); Serbian magnate Radoslav Hlapen (2nd)
Olivera	Vukašin and Jelena	fl. 1364	Spouse of Serbian magnate Đurađ I Balšić
Maria Angelina	Simeon Uroš and Thomais Orsini	1349–1394	Spouse of Serbian magnate Thomas Preljubović (1st); Florentine nobleman Esau de' Buondelmonti (2nd)
Helena	John Uroš and Hlapenova	fl. 1390	Spouse of Byzantine nobleman Theodore Kantakouzenos
Asanina	John Uroš and Hlapenova		
Jelena	Lazar and Milica Nemanjić	1365–1443	Spouse of Serbian magnate Đurađ II Balšić (1st); Bosnian nobleman Sandalj Hranić (2nd)
Mara	Lazar and Milica Nemanjić	fl. 1371–d. 1426	Spouse of Serbian magnate Vuk Branković
Dragana	Lazar and Milica Nemanjić	fl. 1380s–95	Spouse of Bulgarian emperor Ivan Shishman
Teodora	Lazar and Milica Nemanjić	fl. 1387	Spouse of Hungarian palatine Nicholas II Garai
Olivera	Lazar and Milica Nemanjić	ca. 1372–1444	Spouse of Ottoman sultan Bayezid I
Mara	Đurađ Branković and Irene Kantakouzene	1416–1487	Spouse of Ottoman sultan Murad II
Katarina	Đurađ Branković and Irene Kantakouzene	fl. 1432	Spouse of Hungarian count Ulrich II
Jelena–Mara	Lazar Branković and Helena Palaiologina	ca. 1447–1500	Spouse of Bosnian king Stephen Tomašević
Milica	Lazar Branković and Helena Palaiologina	d. 1464	Spouse of Epirote ruler Leonardo III Tocco
Jerina	Lazar Branković and Helena Palaiologina	fl. 1495	Spouse of Albanian nobleman Gjon Kastrioti II
Jerina	Stefan Branković and Angelina Arianiti	fl.	
Marija	Stefan Branković and Angelina Arianiti	d. 1495	Spouse of Holy Roman marquess Boniface III
Milica	Stefan Branković and Angelina Arianiti	d. 1554	Spouse of Wallachian duke Neagoe Basarab
Teodora	Dejan and Teodora Nemanjić	ca. 1397.	Spouse of Zetan lord Đurađ I Balšić
Jelena	Konstantin Dejanović and Unknown	1372–1450	Spouse of Byzantine emperor Manuel II Palaiologos
Jelisaveta	Đurađ I Balšić and Olivera Mrnjavčević	d. 1443	Spouse of Scutari nobleman Rajko Moneta
Goisava	Đurađ I Balšić and Olivera Mrnjavčević	d. 1398	Spouse of Bosnian lord Radič Sanković
Jevdokija	Đurađ I Balšić and Teodora Dejanović		Spouse of Epirote despot Esau de' Buondelmonti
Ruđina	Balša Balšić and Comita Muzaka	fl. 1396–1420	Spouse of Serbian nobleman Mrkša Žarković
Jelena	Balša Stracimirović and Bolja Zaharia		Spouse of Bosnian duke Stjepan Vukčić Kosača
Teodora	Balša Stracimirović and Bolja Zaharia		Spouse of Bosnian nobleman Petar Vojsalić

== Modern ==
=== Principality of Serbia ===
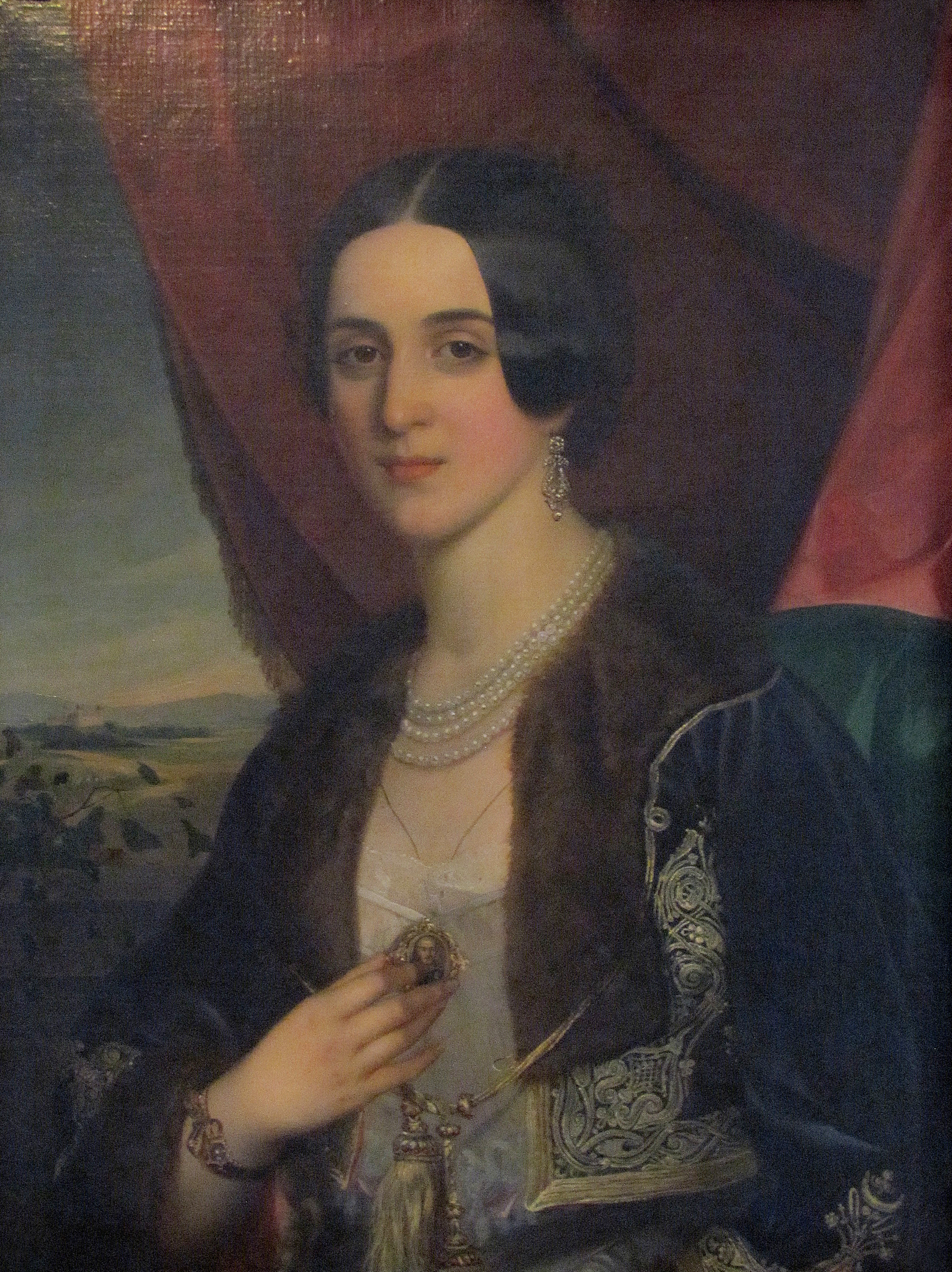
Princess Jelisaveta Obrenović

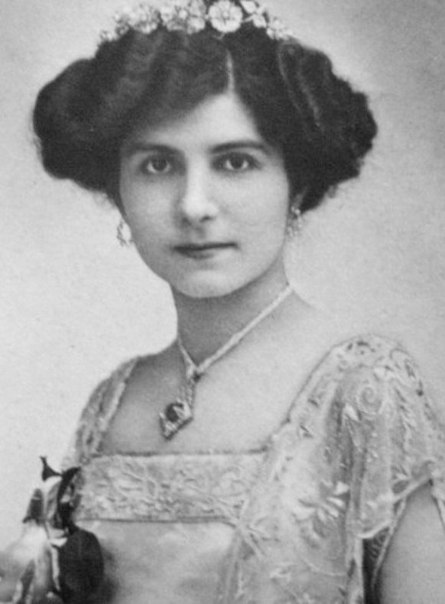
Princess Jelena Petrovna of Russia

Princess	Parentage	Lifespan	Occupation
Petrija	Miloš Obrenović and Ljubica Vukomanović	1808–1870	Spouse of Teodor Bajić
Savka	Miloš Obrenović and Ljubica Vukomanović	1814–1848	Spouse of Jovan Nikolić
Gabrijela	Miloš Obrenović and Ljubica Vukomanović	b. d.	—
Marija	Miloš Obrenović and Ljubica Vukomanović	b. d. 1830	—
Poleksija	Alexander Karađorđević and Persida Nenadović	1833–1914	Spouse of minister Konstantin Nikolajević (1st); doctor Alexander Preshern (2nd)
Kleopatra	Alexander Karađorđević and Persida Nenadović	1835–1855	Spouse of diplomat Avram Petronijević
Jelena	Alexander Karađorđević and Persida Nenadović	1846–1867	Spouse of minister Đorđe Simić
Jelisaveta	Alexander Karađorđević and Persida Nenadović	b. d. 1850	—

=== Kingdom of Serbia ===
Princess	Parentage	Lifespan	Occupation
Jelena	Petar Karađorđević and Zorka Petrović-Njegoš	1884–1962	Spouse of Russian prince John Konstantinovich
Milena	Petar Karađorđević and Zorka Petrović-Njegoš	1886–1887	

== See also ==
- List of Serbian monarchs
- List of Serbian consorts

== Sources ==
- Ivić, Aleksa (1928). Родословне таблице српских династија и властеле. Novi Sad: Matica Srpska.
- Nikolić, Dejan (1996). Svi vladari Srbije. Resavska škola.
- Purković, Miodrag (1956). Princeze iz kuće Nemanjića. Avala.
- Purković, Miodrag (1996). Принцезе из куће Немањића. Belgrade.
- Purković, Miodrag (1996). Кћери кнеза Лазара [Daughters of Prince Lazar]. Belgrade.
- Veselinović, Andrija; Ljušić, Radoš (2002). Rodoslovi srpskih dinastija. Platoneum. ISBN 9788683639021.
