= Irene Shpata =

Medieval Albanian Despotess of the Shpata family

Irene Shpata Irena Shpata
- Despotess of Ioannina

Despotess of Ioannina
- Tenure: 4 January 1396 – 1402
- Predecessor: Maria Angelina Doukaina Palaiologina
- Successor: Evdokia Balsha
- Spouse: Unknown Shpata; Unknown Marchesano of Naples Esau de' Buondelmonti (m. 1396; ann. 1402)
- Issue: Muriq Shpata; Jakup Bua Shpata; Carlo Marchesano; Maddalena de' Buondelmonti
- House: Shpata
- Father: Gjin Bua Shpata

Irene Shpata (Albanian: Irena Shpata), also known as Eirene Spata, was an Albanian noblewoman and member of the Shpata family.

== Life ==
Irene Shpata was the daughter of Gjin Bua Shpata, an Albanian Despot of the Despotate of Arta and the son of Peter Bua Shpata, Lord of Angelokastron. The identity of her mother remains unknown, and not much is known about her early life.

== Marriages and political alliances ==
She was first married to a member of the Shpata family, although his name remains unknown. Her second marriage was to an Italian Marchesano of Naples, an unnamed baron in the Morea, who had served as a Baillie of the Principality of Achaia, although his leadership during this time was ineffective. Gjin Bua Shpata, after securing his share of the ransom money for the release of the Grand Master of the Knights of Rhodes, Heredia, totaling eight thousand florins, used it to provide a dowry for his daughter Irene. The marriage occurred before April 1381, and Marchesano took Irene to live in Naupaktos, where he remained until at least 1386. This suggests that Gjin Bua Shpata had already taken control of Naupaktos, likely through conquest.

Irene Shpata's third marriage was to Esau de' Buondelmonti, the Despot of Ioannina, on January 4, 1396. This union followed the death of Esau's previous wife, Maria Angelina Doukaina Palaiologina, on December 28, 1394. Maria, the widow of Thomas Preljubović, had been a well-regarded figure in Ioannina, known for her piety and influence. After a year of mourning, Esau's advisors encouraged him to remarry, and a marriage to Irene was arranged to strengthen ties with the Shpata family, rulers of Arta, who had long been in conflict with Ioannina.

The chronicler of Ioannina described Irene as courageous, intelligent, beautiful, and virtuous. At the very least, her time with her second husband, an Italian noble, may have exposed her to Western customs. Despite the marriage, tensions in the region persisted. Shortly after the wedding, her father, Gjin Bua Shpata, engaged in battle against Ottoman forces near Ioannina. Though Esau was not directly involved, the Ottomans likely viewed his new alliance with the Shpata family with suspicion.

In April 1399, Esau launched a military campaign against the Albanian chieftain Gjin Zenevisi but suffered a disastrous defeat and was taken prisoner. His ransom was eventually secured through the efforts of Florentine bankers and Venetian officials, and he was released in July 1399, returning to Ioannina to resume his rule. Just two months after Esau's return to Ioannina, Irene's father, Gjin Bua Shpata, died on October 29, 1399. With no male heir, the leadership of Arta passed to his brother, Skurra Bua Shpata.

== Divorce and later life ==
In 1402, Esau de' Buondelmonti divorced Irene. The reasons for the divorce are not entirely clear, but it may have been influenced by political motivations. Following the divorce, Esau married Evdokia Balsha, the sister of a leading Ottoman vassal, Kostandin Balsha.

== Family ==
Irene Shpata married three times, first to an unknown member of the Shpata family, then to an unnamed Marchesano of Naples, and finally to Esau de' Buondelmonti. She had four children:

Unknown Shpata

- Muriq Shpata, Lord of Arta, married Nerata
- Jakup Bua Shpata, Lord of Arta, married daughter of Muriki Boua

Unknown Marchesano of Naples

- Carlo Marchesano

Esau de' Buondelmonti

- Maddalena de' Buondelmonti, died in 1402.

== Family tree ==
Ancestors of Irene Shpata

4. Pjetër Bua Shpata
2. Gjin Bua Shpata
5. Unknown
1. Irene Shpata
6. Unknown
3. Unknown
7. Unknown

== See also ==
- Despot of Epirus

== Bibliography ==
- Fine, John V. A. (1994). The Late Medieval Balkans: A Critical Survey from the Late Twelfth Century to the Ottoman Conquest. University of Michigan Press. ISBN 978-0-4720-8260-5.
- Hopf, Karl (1873). Chroniques greco-romanes inedites ou peu connues [Unpublished or little-known Greco-Roman chronicles] (in French). Weidmann.
- Nicol, Donald M. (1984). The Despotate of Epiros 1267-1479 A Contribution to the History of Greece in the Middle Ages. Cambridge University Press. ISBN 978-0-5212-6190-6.
- Soulis, George Christos (1984). The Serbs and Byzantium During the Reign of Tsar Stephen Dušan (1331-1355) and His Successors. Dumbarton Oaks Library and Collection. ISBN 978-0-8840-2137-7.
