= Maurice Spata =

Lord of Arta

Murik Shpata
- Lord of Arta
- Reign: 1399 – 1414 or 1415
- Predecessor: Sgouros Shpata
- Inherited by his brother: Yaqub Shpata
- Born: 14th century Arta, Despotate of Arta
- Died: 1414 or 1415
- Noble family: Shpata family
- Spouse: Nerata
- Issue: See section
- Mother: Irene Shpata

Muriku or Maurice Shpata (Albanian: Murik Shpata; fl. 1399–1414) was the ruler of Arta from late 1399/early 1400 until his death in 1414 or 1415. Murik’s reign was dominated by his wars with Carlo I Tocco. Murik was able to defend his capital of Arta, but despite some victories failed to prevent the fall of Ioannina to Tocco. As a result, his brother Yaqub Shpata who succeeded him was defeated in October 1416, ending the Despotate of Arta.

== Life ==
Muriq was a scion of the Albanian Shpata family. He was a grandson of Gjin Bua Shpata, the first Albanian ruler of Arta. He was born in the 14th century in Arta during its time under the Despotate of Arta. He had one brother, Yaqub Shpata, and two half-siblings from his mother's second marriage, Charles Marchesano and Maddalena. Shortly before Gjin died on 29 October 1399, he appointed his brother, Skurra Bua Shpata, ruler of Naupactus, as his successor as Lord of Arta. A few days after Skurra took over Arta, however, the town was captured by the adventurer Vonko. While Skurra fled to Angelokastron, a short time after, possibly as early as December 1399, Muriq managed to evict Vonko from Arta and took over the governance of the city himself.

Map of the southern Balkans and western Anatolia in 1410. Ottoman and Turkish territories are marked in shades of brown, Byzantine territory in pink, Venetian and Venetian-influenced areas in green, and other Latin principalities in blue

In 1402–03, Muriq came to Skurra’s aid when the latter was besieged at Angelokastron by the forces of Carlo I Tocco. The attack, under Carlo's general Galasso Peccatore, was repulsed, but Skurra died soon after, leaving his possessions to his son Pal Shpata. In his campaigns against the Shpatas, Tocco was supported by a rival Albanian clan to the Shpatas, the Bua brothers Muriq and Dimo. In 1406, Carlo and the Bua brothers joined forces to raid and devastate Acarnania and the vicinity of Arta, but the city itself, stoutly defended by Muriq Shpata, held out. At Angelokastron, however, Pal Shpata, who lacked his father's ability, felt threatened by the Tocco advance and in 1406 called in Ottoman assistance. The Ottoman army, under Yusuf Beg, was defeated, however, and the Turks departed after coming to terms with the Tocchi. As Maurice refused to come to his cousin's aid, Paul ceded Angelokastron to the Ottomans (only for Carlo Tocco to capture it within less than a year) and retired to Naupactus, which he sold to Venice in 1407–08.

In order to contain Tocco, Muriq turned to his northern neighbour, the Despot of Ioannina, Esau de' Buondelmonti. Relations between them were tense because Esau, who in 1396 had taken Muriq's mother Irene as his wife, had divorced her in 1402 to marry Eudokia Balšić. Nevertheless, the common threat brought the two together, and in ca. 1410, an alliance was concluded between them, sealed by the marriage of Muriq's daughter to Esau's son, Giorgio. The war between Muriq and Carlo Tocco was a war of raids and counter-raids, punctuated by battles that ended now in defeat and now in victory, with intermittent truces sealed by marriage alliances, such as when Charles Marchesano was wed to a natural daughter of Carlo Tocco. It was on the occasion of the latter, which was held at Rogoi, that Muriq and his guests were informed of Esau's death on 6 February 1411. This event triggered a contest between Tocco and the Albanian lords to secure possession of Ioannina, left in the hands of the infant Giorgio and his mother, for themselves. The major role in subsequent developments was played by the inhabitants of Ioannina themselves, who soon deposed Eudokia Balšić and Giorgio. Allied with the lord of Gjirokastër, Gjon Zenebishi, Muriq unsuccessfully besieged the Epirote capital twice and plundered its environs. The Ioannites, who utterly opposed the idea of having an Albanian or Serbian ruler over them, opted to surrender their city to Tocco instead, who entered the city in triumph on 1 April.

This event consolidated the pact between Muriq and Zenebishi, which was further confirmed by another marriage alliance between Muriq’s daughter and Zenebishi's son Simon. The two Albanian lords were willing to negotiate with Tocco, but the latter, buoyed by his success, launched raids against both their territories. As a result, Muriq and Zenebishi sent appeals to their clansmen, and a large Albanian army met and almost annihilated the Tocco army at a battle fought at Kranea in the district of Mesopotamon, in spring or summer 1412. The victorious Albanians marched to the walls of Ioannina, but were again unable to take the city. In late 1412 or early 1413, Carlo Tocco was forced to turn to the Turks for support, arranging for the marriage of one of his natural daughters with Musa Çelebi, one of the Ottoman princes contending for the sultanate during the Ottoman Interregnum. The alliance eased Tocco's position, but Musa was defeated and killed later in the year by his brother, Mehmed I. At the same time, Muriq concluded an alliance to Tocco's Italian rival in the Morea, the Prince of Achaea Centurione II Zaccaria. Muriq's half-brother Charles, who had been appointed governor of Rhiniasa, tried to go over to Tocco, but was apprehended by the local magnates and handed over to Muriq. A scandal involving Zenebishi's son and a son-in-law of Muriq led to a quarrel between the two Albanian rulers and the collapse of their alliance. Tocco moved quickly to win over Zenebishi and conclude peace with him. Muriq died in 1414 or 1415, and was succeeded by his full brother, Yaqub Shpata, in Arta, while Charles Marchesano was given the governorship of Rogoi. Muriq's successors proved unable to withstand Tocco's assaults, however, and in October 1416, Yaqub was captured and killed in an ambush. Arta surrendered, ending the era of Albanian rule in the area.

== Issue ==
From his marriage to Nerata, a Serbian woman, Muriq is known to have had a number of unnamed daughters, usually considered to have been three:

- a daughter who married Giorgio de' Buondelmonti.
- a daughter who married Simon Zenebishi, lord of Strovilo.
- a daughter who married, after Muriq's death, Carlo II Tocco.

The first daughter is believed by Karl Krumbacher to have married Giorgio, a son of "George Balšić and Eudokia".

== Sources ==
- Fine, John V. A. (1994) [1987]. The Late Medieval Balkans: A Critical Survey from the Late Twelfth Century to the Ottoman Conquest. Ann Arbor, Michigan: University of Michigan Press. ISBN 978-0-472-10079-8.
- Nicol, Donald M. (1984). The Despotate of Epiros, 1267–1479: A Contribution to the History of Greece in the Middle Ages. Cambridge: Cambridge University Press. ISBN 978-0-521-13089-9.
- Trapp, Erich; Beyer, Hans-Veit; Walther, Rainer; Sturm-Schnabl, Katja; Kislinger, Ewald; Leontiadis, Ioannis; Kaplaneres, Sokrates (1976–1996). Prosopographisches Lexikon der Palaiologenzeit (in German). Vienna: Verlag der Österreichischen Akademie der Wissenschaften. ISBN 3-7001-3003-1.
- CRONACA DEI TOCCO DI CEFALONIA

Preceded by Sgouros Spata	Lord of Arta; 1401–1414	Succeeded by Yaqub Spata
