= Spata family =

Noble family from Albania

Spata Shpata Spatas
- Noble family
- Parent house: Bua
- Country: Medieval Albania
- Titles: count, despot
- Connected families: Arianiti family
- Estates: Aetolia (Early 1360s–?); Angelokastron (?–1399); Acheloos (?–1399); Nafpaktos or "Lepanto" (1377–78; 1380–?); Arta (1377–99)

The Spata family (Albanian: Shpata) was an Albanian noble family which rose to prominence in the 14th, 15th and 16th centuries, initially as Venetian vassals and later as Ottoman vassals. The family's progenitors were the brothers Gjin Bua Shpata and Skurra Bua Shpata. Shpata means "sword" in Albanian.

== History ==
In the first half of the 14th century, mercenaries, raiders and migrants known in Greek as Άλβανοί (Albanoi or "Albanians") flooded into Greece (specifically raiding Thessaly in 1325 and 1334). In 1358, Albanians got regions of Epirus, Acarnania and Aetolia under their rule and established two principalities under their leaders, Gjin Bua Shpata and Pjetër Losha. Naupactus (Lepanto) was later taken in 1378. The Shpata family frequently collaborated with the Ottomans and saw them as protectors.

Although German historian Karl Hopf provided a genealogy of the Shpata family, it is deemed by modern scholarship as "altogether inaccurate".

According to Schirò, Shpata family was not kin (blood relatives) with the later Bua family. However this theory is rejected and their first name was Bua, while the name Spata appears to them as a second name, creating a cadet branch of the Buas.

== Family tree ==
- Pjetër Bua Shpata
  - Gjin Bua Shpata, married Helena Preljubović
    - Irene Shpata, married Unknown Shpata, Unknown Marchesano of Naples, Esau de' Buondelmonti
      - Muriq Shpata, married Nerata
        - Unknown Shpata, married Giorgio de' Buondelmonti
        - Unknown Shpata, married Simon Zenebishi
        - Unknown Shpata, married Carlo II Tocco
      - Jakup Bua Shpata, married daughter of Muriki Bua
      - Carlo Marchesano, married daughter of Carlo I Tocco
      - Maddalena de' Buondelmonti, died in 1402
  - Skurra Bua Shpata
    - Pal Bua Shpata
    - Unknown Shpata, married Lalthi
    - Petronella Shpata, married Ercole Tocco
      - Carlo Tocco
      - Leonardo Tocco
    - Sterina Shpata, married Francesco Foscari
      - Philip Foscari
  - Unknown Shpata
  - Unknown Shpata
    - Peter Lord of Katochi

== Bibliography ==
- Aleksić, Marko (2007). Mediaeval Swords from Southeastern Europe: Material from 12th to 15th Century. Belgrade: Marko Aleksić. GGKEY:UJ4HA53C8R7.
- Hammond, Nicholas Geoffrey Lemprière (1976). Migrations and Invasions in Greece and Adjacent Areas. Park Ridge, NJ: Noyes Press. ISBN 0-8155-5047-2.
- Kollias, A. (1990). Αρβανίτες και η καταγωγή των Ελλήνων [Arvanites and the Origin of the Greeks] (in Greek) (6th ed.). Athens.
- Luttrell, Anthony (1982). Latin and Greece: The Hospitallers and the Crusades, 1291–1440. London: Ashgate Publishing Limited. ISBN 978-0-86078-106-6.
- Madgearu, Alexandru; Gordon, Martin (2008). The Wars of the Balkan Peninsula: Their Medieval Origins. Lanham, MD: Scarecrow Press. ISBN 978-0-8108-5846-6.
- Nicol, Donald M. (1984). The Despotate of Epiros 1267-1479 A Contribution to the History of Greece in the Middle Ages. Cambridge University Press. ISBN 978-0-5212-6190-6.
- Pipa, Arshi (1978). Albanian Folk Verse: Structure and Genre. Munich: Trofenik. ISBN 978-3-87-828119-1.
- Schirò, Giuseppe (1971–1972). "La genealogia degli Spata tra il XIV e XV sec. E due Bua sconosciuti". Rivista di Studi Bizantini e Neoellenici. 28–29: 67–85.
