= Paul Boua Spata =

Medieval Albanian Nobleman of the Spata family

Paul Boua Spata Pal Bua Shpata
- Lord of Angelokastron; Lord of Naupaktos
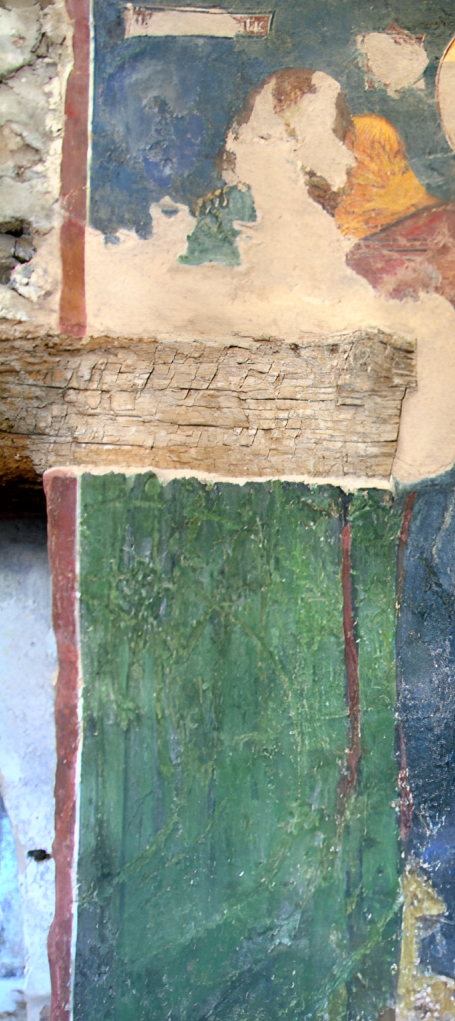
- Depiction of Pal Bua Shpata, Church of the Parigoritissa, Arta, late 14th-early 15th century.

Lord of Angelokastron
- Reign: 1403-1407
- Predecessor: Skurra Bua Shpata
- Successor: Position abolished (Relinquished to Ottomans)

Lord of Naupaktos
- Reign: 1403-1407
- Predecessor: Skurra Bua Shpata
- Successor: Position abolished (Relinquished to Venice)
- Born: Unknown
- Died: Unknown
- House: Spata
- Father: Skurra Bua Shpata
- Mother: Unknown
- Religion: Eastern Orthodoxy

Paul Boua Spata (Albanian: Pal Bua Shpata), also known as Pavlos, was an Albanian nobleman who was the Lord of Angelokastron & Naupaktos from 1403 to 1407. He was a member of the Spata family.

== Early life & Inheritance ==
Paul Shpata was the son of Skurra Bua Shpata, an Albanian nobleman who was the Lord of Angelokastron. The identity of his mother remains unknown, and not much is known about his early life.

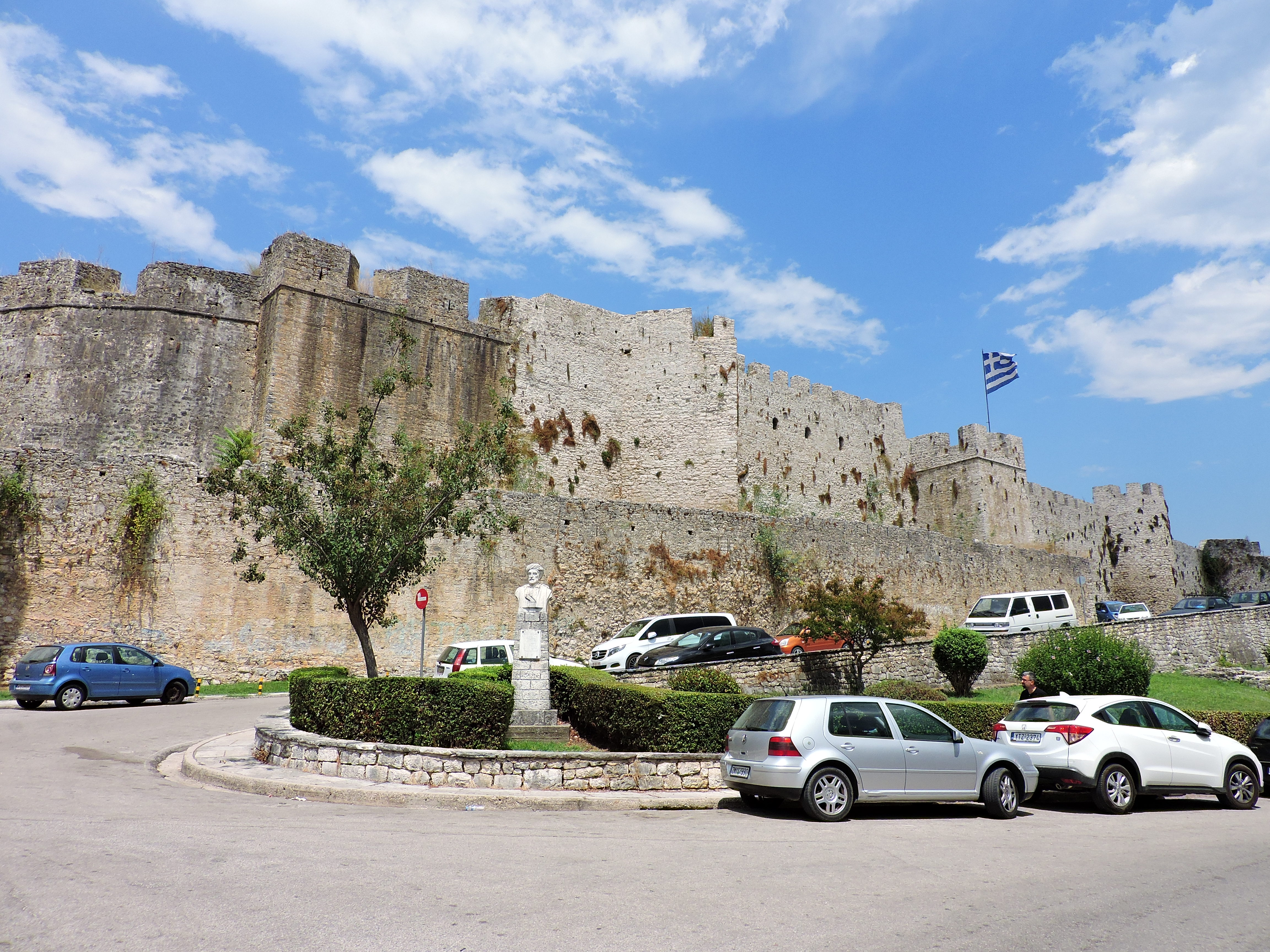
Castle of Arta

Paul inherited Angelokastron and Naupaktos following the death of his father in 1403, during a time of widespread instability and civil war among the Albanian families of western Greece. His father previously tried to claim the city of Arta after the death of Paul’s uncle Gjin Bua Shpata around 1399-1400. However, he was forced out by a local figure named Vango, who styled himself as a "Serbo-Albano-Bulgaro-Vlach." Although Vango was eventually expelled from the city, it was not restored to Paul's father, Skurra, but instead passed to Muriq Shpata, Gjin's grandson.

Skurra withdrew to Angelokastron, where he held out against increasing pressure from Carlo I Tocco, the ruler of Cephalonia and Leukas. After sustaining serious injuries in the fighting, Skurra died in 1403, and Paul inherited his father's lands.

== Conflict ==
Territorial expansion of Carlo I Tocco

Paul’s leadership began under difficult circumstances. The Spata and Boua clans were divided, and members of each family held scattered territories in the region. These divisions worked in favor of Carlo I Tocco, who used both diplomacy and military force to break Albanian resistance. He drew in local lords with offers of land and titles, secured alliances through marriage-including one between his cousin and Dimo Boua and bribed Muriki Boua, Dimo’s brother and a rival of Paul Spata, to join his cause.

Throughout the early 1400s, Tocco led a series of campaigns across Aetolia and Acarnania. His forces captured or raided key sites such as Katochi, Barnako, and Kandeles, tightening their hold on the region. Paul, isolated and outmatched, struggled to defend Angelokastron as more coastal towns fell.

One of the final blows came with the loss of Dragameston and Anatoliko. Dragameston, commanded by Lalthi who was Paul’s brother-in-law through his sister’s marriage, was also taken. While Lalthi escaped, Paul’s sister was captured and sent to Leukas to be held for ransom. Both these cities are critical to maintaining connections with the outside world.

== Later Life & Disappearance ==
Map of the Balkan's in 1410

With little options left, Paul turned to the Ottoman Empire for military assistance. In 1406, an Ottoman force crossed into western Greece to support him, but the campaign quickly fell apart. Many Ottoman troops drowned attempting to cross the swollen Acheloos River, and the survivors were defeated near Vonitsa. Following the failed campaign, the Ottoman commander Yusuf Beg signed a treaty with Carlo I Tocco, leaving Paul without any meaningful allies.

Paul then gave up Angelokastron to the Ottomans and withdrew to Naupaktos, the last remaining stronghold under his control. With Venice already showing interest in the strategically valuable port, Paul entered negotiations.

In May 1407, Paul formally agreed to sell Naupaktos to the Republic of Venice for 1,500 ducats, finalizing the transfer by mid-1408. His brother-in-law Francesco Foscari, a Venetian noble married to his sister Sterina Shpata, may have helped broker the deal. Paul disappears from the historical record after the sale, marking the end of Spata family rule in Aetolia and Acarnania.

By that time, Carlo I Tocco had consolidated control over the entire region. Venetian documents confirm that Angelokastron was under his control by July 1408, and he delegated its administration along with Katochi and the Acheloos valley to his loyal Albanian ally Dimo Boua.

== Depiction ==
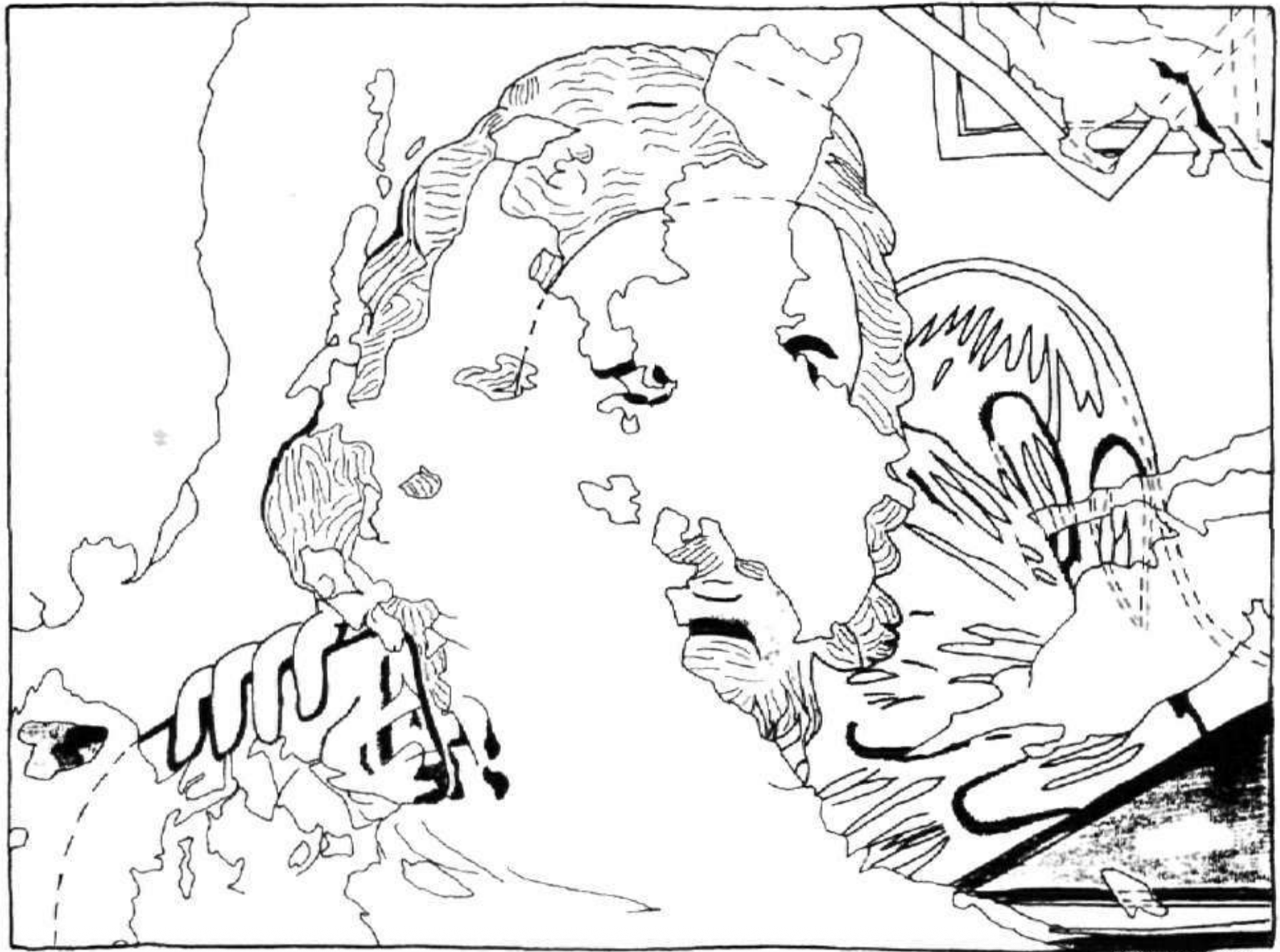
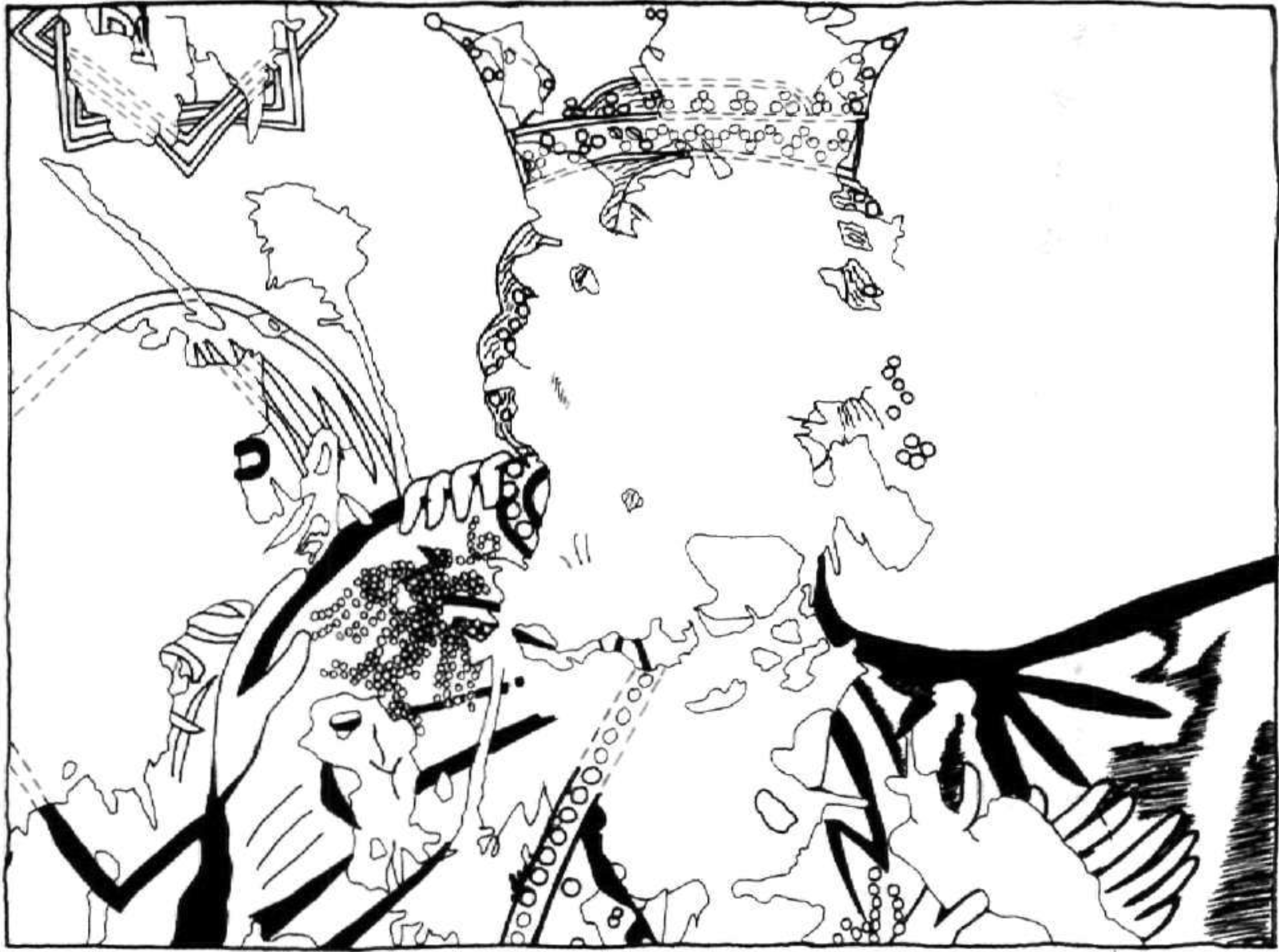
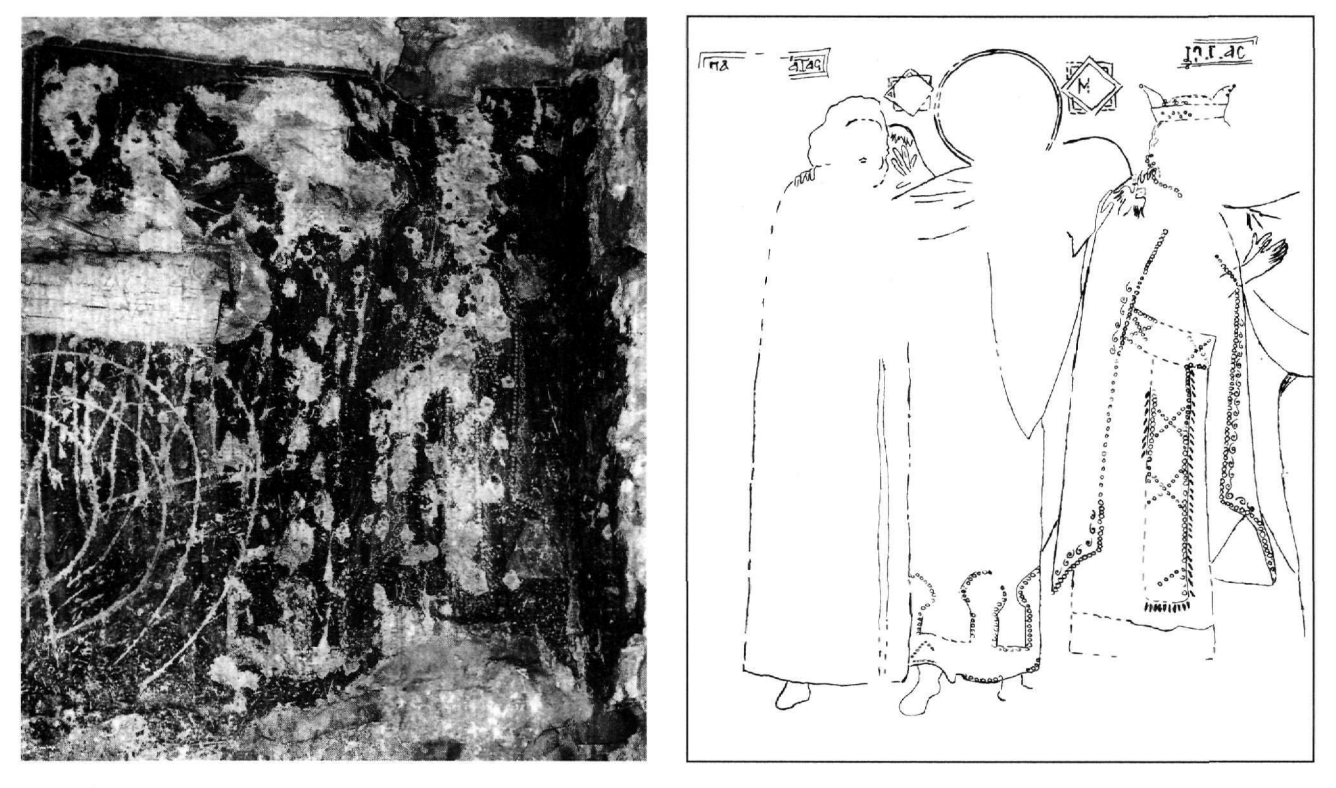
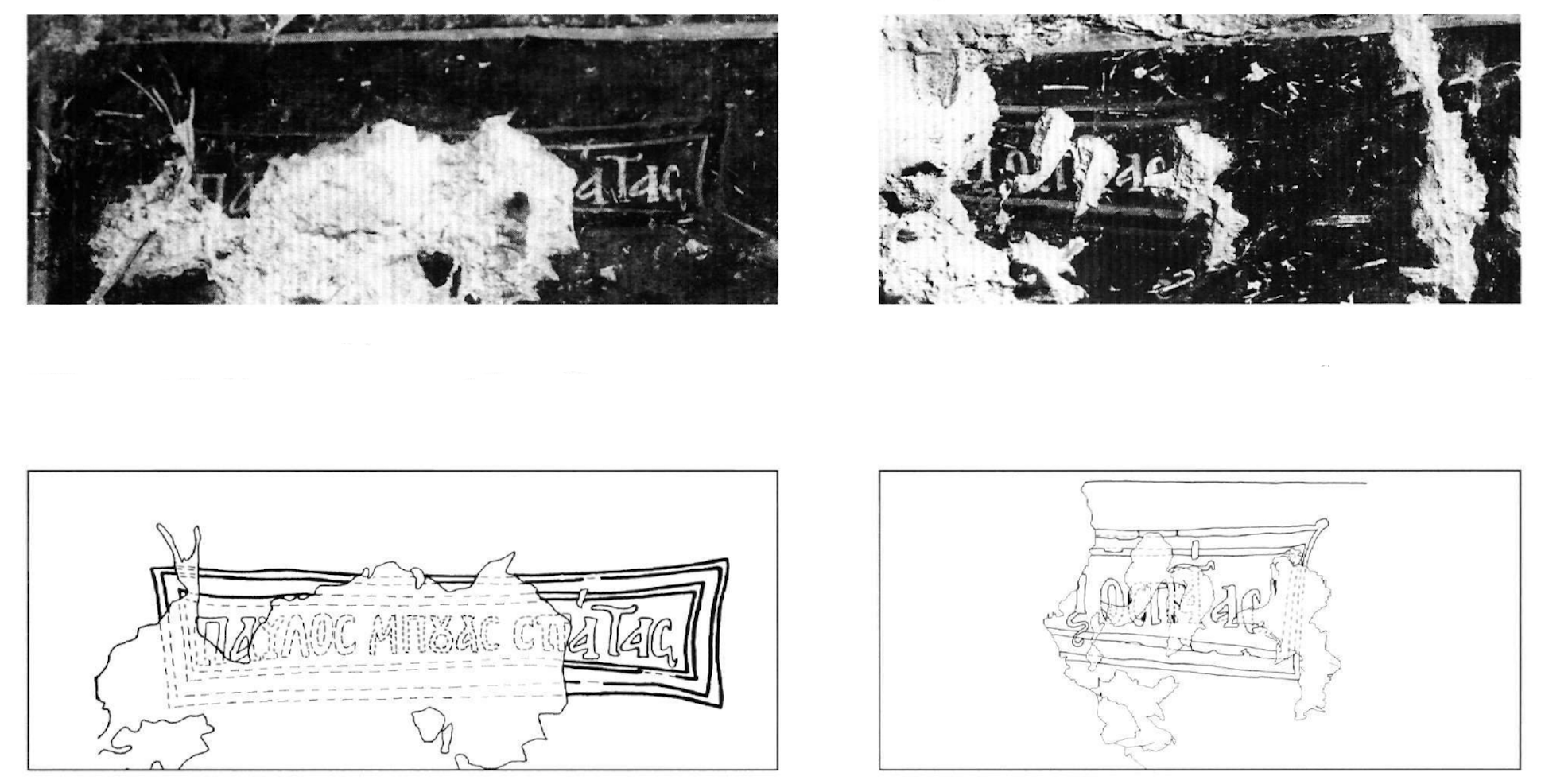
Clockwise from upper left: Depiction of Pal Bua Shpata, Depiction of Gjin Bua Shpata or Muriq Shpata, Inscriptions above fresco, Shpata family Fresco.

The fresco in the Church of the Parigoritissa in Arta, likely commissioned or funded by Paul Spata, depicts him alongside another noble figure, commonly identified as his uncle Gjin Bua Shpata or possibly his cousin Muriq Shpata. Paul is shown wearing relatively modest clothing without clear symbols of rank, suggesting a subordinate or less dominant political role compared to the other figure, who is dressed in luxurious Byzantine-style aristocratic robes embroidered with intricate patterns and adorned with imperial double-headed eagle motifs. This rich attire reflects the high status of the other noble, possibly Gjin or Muriq who held greater political authority in Arta. The fresco is a funerary scene showing both figures approaching the enthroned Christ, with the Archangel Michael and the Virgin Mary acting as intermediaries-an iconography typical in Byzantine memorial art.

== See also ==
- Shpata family
- Despotate of Arta
- Despot of Epirus

== Bibliography ==
- Fine, John V. A. (1994). The Late Medieval Balkans: A Critical Survey from the Late Twelfth Century to the Ottoman Conquest. University of Michigan Press. ISBN 978-0-4720-8260-5.
- Nicol, Donald M. (1984). The Despotate of Epiros 1267-1479 A Contribution to the History of Greece in the Middle Ages. Cambridge University Press. ISBN 978-0-5212-6190-6.
- Papadopoulou, Varvara N. (2011). Επιτύμβια παράσταση στο ναό της Παναγίας Παρηγορήτισσας στην Άρτα [Funerary scene at the church of Panagia Parigoritissa in Arta] (in Greek).
- Shields, Robin Alexander (2019). Trade and Diplomacy in the fifteenth-century Balkans: Carlo II Tocco and the Despotate of Arta (1429-1448) (PDF). Royal Holloway, University of London.
- Stavrakos, Christos (2020). The Albanian Family of Spata in the Late Byzantine and Post-Byzantinte Epirus: the Epigraphic Evidence.
