= Zampia Palaiologina =

Byzantine princess

- Born: Late 1370s
- Spouse: Hilario Doria
- Issue: Zampia Palaiologina Doria; Another daughter
- House: Palaiologos
- Father: John V Palaiologos
- Mother: Unknown

Zampia Palaiologina (Greek: Ζαμπíα Παλαιολογίνα), also known as Zampea or Isabella, was a Byzantine princess of the Palaiologos dynasty. She was an illegitimate daughter of Emperor John V Palaiologos (r. 1341–1391) and married the envoy and translator Hilario Doria, with whom she had at least two daughters. Her name may not have been Zampia, which could have been applied to her by later historians out of confusion with one of her daughters of this name.

== Family background and name ==
Zampia Palaiologina is mentioned as the illegitimate daughter of Byzantine emperor Manuel II Palaiologos (r. 1391–1425) in 16th-century chronicle writings of the Ecumenical Patriarchate of Constantinople, which also record her marriage to Hilario Doria, an Italian nobleman who had converted from Catholicism to Orthodoxy and served the Byzantine government as an envoy and translator. Though this relation has historically often been taken at face value, it is likely a mistake on the part of the scribe of the chronicles; contemporary Greek sources designate Hilario as Manuel's gambros (which can mean either son-in-law or brother-in-law, likely the source for the mistake) but Western documents explicitly designate him as Manuel's cognatus, levir or sororius (brother-in-law). This means that Zampia was actually Manuel's half-sister and thus an illegitimate daughter of his father John V Palaiologos (r. 1341–1391).

The Byzantinist Thierry Ganchou, who through examining relevant documents demonstrated that Zampia was Manuel's sister rather than daughter, has also cast doubt on whether her name was actually Zampia. Zampia was an unusual name in the Byzantine world since it was the Greek version of the Western European name Isabella; the name otherwise only appears in Byzantine records for western women such as Isabella of Villehardouin, Princess of Achaea, and Isabelle de la Rochette, an influential lady-in-waiting of Empress Anna of Savoy (John's mother). Though Ganchou noted that it was possible that John could have given his daughter an Italian name since his mother was Italian, Ganchou maintained that it would be strange for a Byzantine emperor to give such a name to one of his children, even if they were illegitimate, and suggests that the scribe of the Patriarchal chronicle confused the name of John V's daughter with the name of one of her children. Ganchou suggested that it was more likely that she had a "classic" Byzantine feminine name such as Theodora, Irene, Maria, Helena, Anna or Euphrosyne. The names Zampia or Isabella Palaiologina are regardless routinely used to designate the princess by historians.

== Biography ==
Zampia Palaiologina was born in the late 1370s. The identity of her mother is unknown. Donald Nicol believed that she may have been part of the noble family Dermokaites. John W. Barker instead suggested that Zampia's mother was a westerner, perhaps from Venice, on account of her later marriage to Hilario Doria. The hypothesis that Zampia's mother was Venetian also stems from the previous belief that she was Manuel's daughter – if she had been, she could have been fathered during his stay in Venice from 1370 to 1373.

Zampia was taken care of by her brother Manuel for as long as he lived. She married Hilario Doria in Constantinople in 1392. Hilario's conversion to orthodoxy, recorded in April 1392, may have taken place in connection to the marriage. From 1397 to the middle of 1403, Hilario was in Italy as part of a Byzantine embassy. Zampia did not accompany him and instead remained in Constantinople during this time.

== Children ==
Zampia had at least two children with Hilario Doria, both daughters and both presumably born after Hilario's return to Constantinople in 1403. Hilario also had a third known daughter, Manfredina, who married John Chrysoloras, though whether she was also a daughter of Zampia is disputed; the Prosopographisches Lexikon der Palaiologenzeit states that Zampia had three daughters but Ganchou concluded that Manfredina was probably either illegitimate or from a previous marriage.

- Zampia Palaiologina Doria (fl. 1421/1422), the eldest daughter. Ganchou inferred her name to have been Zampia (Isabella) since Hilario's mother was named Isabella Salvaigo and he suspected that the Zampia Palaiologina mentioned in the patriarchal records was a confusion for Hilario's daughter. Zampia Palaiologina Doria married the Ottoman prince and pretender Küçük Mustafa in 1421 or 1422. The Byzantines bestowed the prestigious but empty title "Lady of Anatolia" (rather than the expected amirissa, "wife of the Emir") on her after the marriage.
- Another daughter (fl. 1421/1422), married to "George Izaoul" in 1421 or 1422. Izaoul is later recorded in the 1420s by George Sphrantzes as a companion of Demetrios Palaiologos. Izaoul has been suggested to have been the same person as the dispossessed Despot of Epirus Giorgio de' Buondelmonti.
