= Brnjača =

Serbian princess

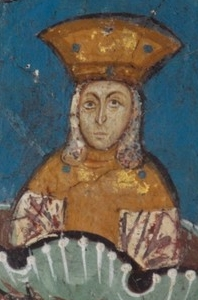
- Brnjača in the Nemanjić family tree fresco, Visoki Dečani (1346).
- Born: c. 1253; Kingdom of Serbia
- Died: after 1264; Kingdom of Serbia
- Burial: Gradac Monastery
- Dynasty: Nemanjić
- Father: Stefan Uroš I
- Mother: Helen of Anjou
- Occupation: Nun

Brnjača (Serbian Cyrillic: Брњача; c. 1253–fl. 1264) was a Serbian princess, the daughter of King Stefan Uroš I (r. 1243–76) and Queen Helen of Anjou. Her brothers were Stefan Dragutin (r. 1276–82) and Stefan Milutin (r. 1282–1321). By birth, she was member of the Nemanjić dynasty, ruling family of the Kingdom of Serbia.

== Biography ==
The oldest depiction of her, when she was ca. 12 years old is in the 1264 fresco of the burial of Queen Anna Dandolo (d. 1258) at the monastery of Sopoćani (the endowment of her father), shown with a low crown, and clothing closed up to the throat, similar to the male clothing, decorated with pearls on piping, although her appearance is anachronistic. She is depicted in the narthex of Visoki Dečani, dating to ca. which dates to ca. to 1350, alongside later Nemanjić members Simeon Uroš and Teodora-Evdokija. and is one of the most notable examples of the Nemanjić family tree. She was a nun, and did not marry. She was buried at the Gradac Monastery (the endowment of her mother), in a tomb below her mother's sarcophagus.

The Old Serbian spelling of her name, as found on the Visoki Dečani family tree fresco, was БРЬНЧA. Her name is variously rendered Brnjača (Брњача), Brnča (Брнча), Brnjča (Брњча), Bereniče (Берениче), Prnjača (Прњача), and Prnča (Прнча). Her name is unusual. D. Kostić wrote on the reading of her name, etymological similarities and possible combinations. He noted similarity with the placename Brnjak, and Slavic male name Prnjak, but was also inclined that it was derived from Veronica. M. Purković said that it perhaps was a diminutive of Bernarde or Bernardine. It was earlier believed that Brnjača was the nickname of her mother (named so due to the main estate of her feudal state, Brnjak).

== See also ==
- List of princesses of Serbia

== Sources ==
Books

- Blagojević, Miloš; Petković, Sreten (1989). Srbija u doba Nemanjića: od kneževine do carstva: 1168-1371: ilustrovana hronika. TRZ "VAJAT". ISBN 9788670390287.
- Ćirković, Sima; Mihaljčić, Rade (1999). Лексикон српског средњег века. Knowledge. ISBN 9788683233014.
- Đurić, Vojislav J. (1978). "Loza Nemanjića u starom srpskom slikarstvu". Zograf (8).
- Kandić, Olivera M. (1982). Manastir Gradac. Republički zavod za zaštitu spomenika kulture.
- Purković, Miodrag (1956). Princeze iz kuće Nemanjića. Avala.
- Stevanović, Miladin (2004). Kraljica Jelena Anžujska. Knjiga-komerc. ISBN 9788677120320.
- Strizović, Đorđe (2004). Прошлост која живи. Доситеј. ISBN 9788676440214.

Journals

- Vranjski Glasnik. Vol. 6. 1970. p. 265.
- Vasić, Pavle (1979). "Српска народна ношња у средњем веку". Гласник Етнографског музеја у Београду. 43: 23–56.
