= Đurađ Balšić =

Đurađ Balšić may refer to:

- Đurađ I Balšić, Lord of Zeta 1362–1378
- Đurađ II Balšić, Lord of Zeta 1385–1403
