= Giorgio de' Buondelmonti =

Ruler of Ioannina
- Reign: 6–26 February 1411
- Predecessor: Esau de' Buondelmonti
- Successor: Carlo I Tocco
- Regent: Jevdokija Balšić
- Born: c. 1403
- Died: After 1435
- Spouse: Daughter of Muriq Shpata
- House: Buondelmonti
- Father: Esau de' Buondelmonti
- Mother: Jevdokija Balšić

Giorgio de' Buondelmonti (Greek: Γεώργιος Μπουοντελμόντι, romanized: Geōrgios Bouontelmonti, c. 1403–after 1435) was the ruler of Ioannina for twenty days in 1411, under the regency of his mother Jevdokija Balšić.

After spending several years in exile, Giorgio reappears in the sources as the Byzantine court official George Izaoul (Greek: Γεώργιος 'ζαοúλ, romanized: Geōrgios Izaoul). Under this name, Giorgio married into the greater Byzantine imperial family and served as a companion of Demetrios Palaiologos, son of Emperor Manuel II Palaiologos. Giorgio remained involved in the affairs of the imperial family, as well as those of the Republic of Ragusa, until at least the 1430s.

== Background ==
Political map of the southern Balkans in 1410

Giorgio de' Buondelmonti was the eldest son of Esau de' Buondelmonti. Giorgio's mother was Jevdokija Balšić, Esau's third wife and a daughter of Đurađ I Balšić, Lord of Zeta. Giorgio had at least one sibling, a younger brother whose name is lost to history. Giorgio was probably named after his maternal grandfather; the name Đurađ is derived from the Greek Geōrgios. Esau and Jevdokija were married in 1402 and Giorgio was probably born c. 1403.

Giorgio's father ruled the city of Ioannina in Epirus, Greece (1385–1411), having assumed that position through marriage to Maria Angelina, widow of the earlier ruler Thomas Preljubović. In 1385 or 1386, Esau was granted the title of despot by the Byzantine emperor John V Palaiologos. Although Ioannina was independent of Byzantine imperial control, Esau maintained close relations with imperial power in Constantinople and sought to be part of the Byzantine political sphere.

Around 1410, Esau betrothed Giorgio to a daughter of Muriq Shpata, the ruler of Arta, seeking to seal a political alliance. Although rivals, the two had a mutual interest in opposing Carlo I Tocco, Esau's nephew and Count Palatine of Cephalonia and Zakynthos. Giorgio was probably around seven years old at the time of the betrothal.

== Ruler of Ioannina ==
Esau de' Buondelmonti died on 6 February 1411, leaving the underage Giorgio to succeed him. Giorgio was immediately proclaimed as the Ioannina's ruler, being hailed as despot, with Maurice Spata's daughter also being officially proclaimed as his co-sovereign. A regency council was set up to govern the city and Giorgio's mother Jevdokija attempted to hold on to her position of power as regent.

Giorgio's reign swiftly became troubled. Jevdokija alienated the aristocracy of Ioannina by reportedly instituting clumsy and "tyrannical" policies contrary to those that had been in place under Esau. At the same time, Maurice Spata sought to take control of Ioannina for himself, sending troops to intimidate the local authorities and ravage the city's outskirts. In order to solidify control, Jevdokija secretly sent messengers "to Serbia" to seek a new husband whom she would offer co-rule of Ioannina. When this plan was discovered, the populace in Ioannina were so outraged that they drove both her and her two sons out of the city. Jevdokija and her sons left Ioannina on 26 February, just twenty days after Esau's death. The people of the city invited Carlo I Tocco to become their new ruler. Carlo arrived in Ioannina on 1 April.

== Later life ==
Coat of arms of Giorgio's father, Esau, as ruler of Ioannina

Jevdokija and her sons initially sought refuge with John Zenevisi, an Albanian magnate who held various fiefs in Epirus. Zenevisi allied with Maurice Spata and inflicted a serious defeat on Tocco in 1412, though he could not push his advantage enough to conquer Ioannina. In time, Zenevisi began to covet the city for himself, and it is likely that Jevdokija and her family left his court at some point in the mid-1410s, their next destination unknown.

In 2008, the French historian Thierry Ganchou identified Giorgio de' Buondelmonti with the Byzantine official George Izaoul, mentioned in a few scattered sources from the 1420s onward. Ganchou identified them as one and the same on account of Izaoul being claimed to be the "son of a despot", that the general ages appear to match, and because certain references suggest that Izaoul had some form of Serbian heritage, which Giorgio had through his mother. The surname Izaoul may be derived from the name of Giorgio's father (Esau); the Byzantines generally resisted Hellenizing foreign surnames that sounded "too barbaric", in such cases instead favoring patronymics.

In 1421 or 1422, George Izaoul is recorded to have married a daughter of Hilario Doria and Zampia Palaiologina, an illegitimate daughter of Emperor John V Palaiologos. At this point in time, Giorgio was not merely a possible claimant to Ioannina but also to Zeta, given that a series of deaths had left him and his brother as the last heirs of the Balšić family. It is possible that his marriage to Hilario Doria's daughter was part of a Byzantine plot to disrupt Ottoman power in the Balkans; another daughter of Doria was married to the Ottoman pretender Küçük Mustafa. In the event of Mustafa's victory, Giorgio, now also tied to the Byzantine imperial family, may have been expected to be granted his ancestral lands.

In 1423, the despot Demetrios Palaiologos, son of Emperor Manuel II Palaiologos, fled the Byzantine Empire to Hungary, recorded by George Sphrantzes as having been accompanied by Hilario Doria and George Izaoul. Demetrios had initially plotted to defect to the Ottomans in his pursuit of imperial power, a plot Giorgio may have been involved in. Demetrios returned to Constantinople in 1427; it is unknown of Izaoul accompanied him.

In 1427, Jevdokija and her two sons are attested as having arrived in the Republic of Ragusa, seeking help to enforce their rights to Zeta. Their arrival in Ragusa and demands for aid caused diplomatic incidents and forced Ragusan authorities to negotiate both with Jevdokija and her sons, as well as with the incumbent ruler of Zeta, Stefan Lazarević. Despite Ragusan pressure, the family stayed in the city until 25 April 1428, when they left for Methoni in the Peloponnese. The family perhaps sought to join up with Emperor John VIII Palaiologos and his brother Constantine, who were in the Peloponnese at the time, fighting against Carlo I Tocco. Giorgio may have fought alongside the Palaiologoi in their various campaigns in the Peloponnese. In 1434, "George Izaoul" is once again attested as living in Constantinople, having left from Methoni on 26 April that year and reaching the capital on 5 May.

The last document that records Giorgio is from Ragusa, a donation of 50 hyperpyra issued on 24 August 1435 to "Giurach, son of Saul, Despot of the Romans". It is unknown what Giorgo was doing in Ragusa at the time.

== Bibliography ==
- Nicol, Donald M. (1984). The Despotate of Epiros 1267-1479 A Contribution to the History of Greece in the Middle Ages. Cambridge University Press. ISBN 978-0-5212-6190-6.

Preceded by Esau de' Buondelmonti	Ruler of Ioannina; 6–26 February 1411	Succeeded by Carlo I Tocco
