= Yaqub Spata =

Last Lord of Arta (c. 1369 – 1416)

- Lord of Arta

Lord of Arta
- Reign: 1414/15 – 1 October 1416
- Predecessor: Maurice Spata
- Born: c. 1369; Arta, Despotate of Arta
- Died: 1 October 1416 (aged 47)
- House: Spata
- Mother: Irene Shpata
- Religion: Christianity(1369-?), Islam(convert)

Yaqub Spata or Shpata (Albanian: Jakup Bua Shpata, Greek: Γιαγούπης Σπάτας) was the last Lord of Arta, ruling from 1414/15 until 1416, with a brief interval when he was evicted by the local population. His rule ended after his capture and execution by Carlo I Tocco, who proceeded to incorporate Arta to his domains.

== Life ==
Yaqub was a scion of the Albanian Shpata family. He was a grandson of Gjon Bua Shpata, the first Albanian ruler of Arta, and son of Gjon's daughter Irene and an unknown member of the Shpata family. He had one brother, Muriq Shpata, and two half-siblings from his mother's second marriage, Charles and Maddalena de' Buondelmonti.

Yaqub was raised at the Ottoman court of Sultan Mehmed I, where he had converted to Islam and acquired his name. In 1414/5, at the time of his elder brother Muriq's death, he claimed the succession over Arta. With the support of his mother Irene, he was successful in securing control over Arta itself, while his half-brother Charles became ruler of nearby Rogoi.

His Muslim faith, however, soon provoked opposition, as the locals feared that he would deliver them to the Ottomans. The local population rose up, imprisoned him and installed his half-brother Charles Marchesano in his place. Released from prison, Yaqub sought refuge in the Ottoman court. There he secured the Sultan's aid. Backed by an Ottoman army under a leader named Ismail, he returned to Arta and recovered the city after a brief siege. He exiled his half-brother in turn, and had the leading men of the city executed for their role in his overthrow.

After recovering Arta, Yaqub was confronted with the designs of the ambitious Count palatine of Cephalonia and Zakynthos, Carlo I Tocco. Carlo had already acquired possession of Ioannina and the northern half of the old Despotate of Epirus a few years previously, posing as the champion of the local Greeks against the Albanian lords who had conquered Epirus, and now set his sights on the southern portions of Epirus around Arta and Aetolia and Acarnania. The chronology of the conflict is somewhat vague, as the main source, the Chronicle of the Tocco, does not follow a strict chronological order. Nevertheless, it is clear that Carlo, using the fortress of Vobliana as his base, was raiding the Spata domains already before Yaqub's return to power. Yaqub, along with his father-in-law, Maurice, who had defected from Tocco service, tried to capture Vobliana. The Spatas were then heavily defeated by Carlo's brother Leonardo II Tocco at Mazoma near ancient Nicopolis, but Carlo's son Torno suffered setbacks against the Albanians.

After the Tocchi succeeded in capturing Rhiniasa, Leonardo tried to take Rogoi and Carlo Arta, but Yaqub and his father-in-law succeeded in defending their capital for the time being. Carlo withdrew to Ioannina, but soon after was able to lure Yaqub in an ambush near Vobliana: Yaqub was captured and immediately executed (1 October 1416). Following his death, the magnates of Arta seized control from Yaqub's mother, and offered to surrender the city to Carlo if their existing rights and privileges were respected. Carlo accepted, and entered Arta on 4 October. At the same time, Leonardo took over Rogoi.

== Sources ==
- Fine, John V. A. (1994) [1987]. The Late Medieval Balkans: A Critical Survey from the Late Twelfth Century to the Ottoman Conquest. Ann Arbor, Michigan: University of Michigan Press. ISBN 978-0-472-10079-8.
- Nicol, Donald M. (1984). The Despotate of Epiros, 1267–1479: A Contribution to the History of Greece in the Middle Ages. Cambridge: Cambridge University Press. ISBN 978-0-521-13089-9.
- Trapp, Erich; Beyer, Hans-Veit; Walther, Rainer; Sturm-Schnabl, Katja; Kislinger, Ewald; Leontiadis, Ioannis; Kaplaneres, Sokrates (1976–1996). Prosopographisches Lexikon der Palaiologenzeit (in German). Vienna: Verlag der Österreichischen Akademie der Wissenschaften. ISBN 3-7001-3003-1.

Preceded by Maurice Spata	Lord of Arta; 1414/5–1416	Conquest by Carlo I Tocco
