= On Exile =

1440 work of political philosophy by Francesco Filelfo

- 2013 translated version from Harvard
- Author: Francesco Filelfo
- Original title: Commentationes Florentinae de exilo
- Language: Latin
- Series: None
- Subject: Political philosophy
- Publication date: 1440
- Publication place: Italy
- English publication date: 2013
- Media type: Print

On Exile (Latin: Commentationes Florentinae de exilo) is a 1440 work of political philosophy by Francesco Filelfo. The overarching purpose of Filelfo's dialogue is to examine the problem of exile and assess how to cope with a demonized and defamed public image.

On Exile depicts a prominent group of Florentine noblemen and humanists, driven from their city by Cosimo de' Medici, discussing the sufferings imposed by exile such as poverty and loss of reputation, and the best way to endure and even profit from them. Filelfo's work depicts a major shift in Florentine political life, a shift whereupon the Medici family seized control of the government from the aristocrats and oligarchs who had governed the Republic of Florence for two centuries.

On Exile is composed of three Books interspersed by brief comic interludes. The dialogue itself is set in Florence, prior to the departure of exiled aristocrats Palla Strozzi and Rinaldo degli Albizzi. The continuous efforts by Palla, Manetti, and Leonardo to establish the true nature of the happy life and the discount the vulgar notions advanced by Poggio Bracciolini lead to a significant discussion regarding the significance of pleasure and the philosophy of Epicurus.

== Contents ==
=== Book I ===
Book I addresses the disadvantages of exile. It assumes the form of a dialogue between Palla, Rinaldo, Palla's son Onofrio Strozzi, Poggio Bracciolini, and Giannozzo Manetti.

After a brief introduction by Filelfo, Palla initiates the dialogue by comforting Onofrio, who is distraught by seeing his father having lost his socioeconomic status and on the verge of being driven from Florence. Onofrio holds that all political regimes will distrust Palla and perceive him as a criminal for being exiled from Florence. Palla counters Onofrio's assertion. He holds that, so long as an exile maintains his ability to demonstrate his virtue through speech and debate, then no political regime will long perceive him as a criminal. Palla announces that his viewpoint was inspired by Socrates, and that "virtue by itself is sufficiently fortified to secure happiness." The happiness of the soul, rather than bodily happiness, is what aristocrats should pursue. Indeed, wise aristocrats should hold the people's favor in contempt whenever it contradicts duty and honor. This brief exchange of opinions between Palla and his son conveys a sense of the overall dynamics of On Exile, where one of the younger participants advances a thesis about the pitiful condition of the exiles, which is in turn answered by one of the most experienced members of the group appealing to an idealized version of the sagacious life.

Rinaldo interjects at the end of Palla's Ciceronian speech. Rinaldo is more bitter than Palla, stating that he would prefer exile from Florence to continued interaction with Cosimo de' Medici and his supporters. Palla acknowledges Rinaldo's position. He laments that he and the other participants in the dialogue did not listen to Rinaldo and permanently banish the Medici family while the aristocrats ruled Florence. However, Palla suggests that Rinaldo restrain his bitterness so that he and the other participants "pursue truth, not quarrels," while they are under house arrest.

Poggio Bracciolini interrupts Palla, stating his dislike for Palla's philosophizing and Manetti's sophistries. Poggio is enamored by bodily pleasures, especially food and drink. He holds that nothing is naturally disgraceful or bad. Manetti rebukes Poggio, proclaiming that excessive pleasure corrupts both man's body and mind. Pleasures also hinder those in exile from tolerating pain and discomfort in a stoic manner. It is worth noting at this point that Poggio was a close friend to the Medicean circle. As such he was one of Filelfo's worst enemies. Filelfo uses a clownish interpretation of Poggio in On Exile to degrade the humanists friendly to the Medicean regime.

At this point in the dialogue Palla, Poggio, and Manetti are attempting to convince Rinaldo and Onofrio of the best way to handle exile from Florence. Palla advocates adopting the mannerisms of a Socratic. Poggio advocates embracing a more Epicurean lifestyle. Manetti advises Rinaldo and Onofrio to adopt a Stoic outlook on life. Palla and Manetti, whose advice share many similarities, dismiss Poggio as a fool unsuited to advise aristocrats. To rebuke Poggio, Palla and Manetti offer quotes and references from the Greek, Roman and Christian traditions.

Palla now addresses Onofrio's primary concern, that the exile has no community. Palla proposes that education and training can foster a greater sense of community than the place of one's birth. He is thus promoting a cosmopolitan sense of community rather than a community based on common cultural markers. Onofrio is dissatisfied but finds himself unable to voice a coherent objection to Palla's claims. He asks Palla to continue the discussion tomorrow.

=== Book II ===
Book II addresses the nature of infamy within political regimes. Francesco Soderini, Ridolfo Peruzzi, and Niccolò Della Luna join the dialogue. Filelfo uses this section of On Exile to examine the spiritual battle between Palla Strozzi and Cosimo de' Medici on whether honesty (represented by Palla) or utilitarian cunning (represented by Cosimo) will dictate Florentine public policy.

After an introduction by Filelfo, Book II begins with Ridolfo praising Rinaldo's early morning exchange with Pope Eugene IV. Rinaldo appears to have convinced Eugenius of his virtue, and that those behind his exile from Florence are criminals and traitors.

Palla congratulates Rinaldo on his rhetorical skill and offers him an apology. Palla maintains that, while serving as a magistrate for Florence, he benefitted "lazy and worthless men" while attempting to preserve political stability. Rinaldo and Ridolfo, together with Onofrio and Onofrio's friend Niccolò disagree with Palla's depiction of his political career. Following one's conscience, according to Ridolfo, is no vice as what is honorable is not easily divorced from what is necessary to preserve public order.

Ridolfo then addresses the constitution of the Florentine people. He describes his fellow countrymen as patriotic, and that no true Florentine would plot against their homeland for any type of reward. The one exception to this rule is Cosimo de' Medici, the cause of the present state of the wisest and most virtuous Florentines to whom Ridolfo speaks. Cosimo's evil stems not only from his character but from his profession: as a banker Cosimo has warped the minds and actions not only of the Florentines, but of the French, British, and Germans as well. Even the Pope has fallen victim to Cosimo's "deceitful banking." Ridolfo ends his speech by declaring Cosimo to have split Florence into two distinct factions. Shopkeepers, gamblers, and other citizens belonging to lower social orders indebted to Cosimo have exiled or intimidated Florence's aristocrats into ceding political power to the Mediceans.

Palla then addresses Poggio, who alone of those participating in the dialogue continues to enjoy the patronage of the Medici family. Palla accuses Poggio of acting unjustly, to which Poggio replies that he is in fact repaying Cosimo for his generous financial support. As such, he is acting justly towards Cosimo rather than endeavoring to act unjustly towards the Florentine exiles.

Poggio's Epicurean desire to live lavishly at the expense of pursuing a virtuous life is the antithesis of Palla's own philosophy, described by fellow exile Manetti as a way of living which honors Plato, Aristotle, and Jesus Christ. Cosimo is by association a supporter of Epicureanism, a philosophy which is according to Filelfo a politically irresponsible doctrine and toxic to the lives of everyone who associates with its adherents.

Palla maintains that, while occupying a position of political power, he lacked a complete understanding of how to handle Cosimo and his supporters. Virtuous men can only make infallible politicians if they possess the three types of virtues. The first category of virtues includes those that are "contemplative," or provide adequate foresight. Palla cites wisdom as an example of a contemplative virtue. The second category includes the rational virtues which inform action, and include cleverness and prudence. Finally, Palla states that the third category of virtues consists of those that enhance the practitioner's reputation. These virtues include justice, courage, generosity, and temperance. If a virtuous magistrate possesses an inadequate grasp of any one of these categories of virtues, then he will be outmaneuvered by men like Cosimo de' Medici.

Palla ends Book II of the dialogue by criticizing men like Cosimo and Poggio, who desire to be well known but do not care whether they enhance their reputations through infamous or honorable acts. By defining the components of virtue and linking virtuous behavior to prudent policymaking, Palla hopes that he has inspired all in attendance to eschew infamy even at the expense of being exiled from their homeland.

=== Book III ===
Book III addresses the nature of poverty. Leonardo Bruni joins the dialogue. Over 30 years prior Bruni had praised Florence as the most cosmopolitan of cities and a safe haven for intellectuals of every stripe.

== Modern analysis ==
Jeron de Keyser, a Research Fellow at the University of Leuven, remarks on how closely Filelfo's dialogue coheres to psychotherapy, "in particular the efficacy of talk or discussion in providing a remedy for psychological pain."

Margaret Meserve proposes that Filelfo's hostility towards Poggio and the Mediceans stemmed from foreign policy concerns as well as frustrations over Florence's continued civil unrest. The expansion of the Ottoman Turks into Europe after their conquest of the Byzantine Empire represented an international threat to all Christian nations. Filelfo's firsthand experiences with the Ottomans would be of great use to Florentine policymakers, yet the Medicean circle that governed Florence had forced him into exile. Meserve claims that On Exile can be interpreted as an appeal to all Florentines that the diplomats best able to negotiate with the Ottoman Turks were those that had been banished from Florence.

== Translations ==
- Filelfo, Franceseco (2013). Jeroen de Keyser (ed.). On Exile. Translated by W. Scott Blanchard. Harvard University Press. ISBN 9780674066366.
