= Vonko =

15th century Serb-Bulgarian-Albanian-Vlach nobleman

Vonko (fl. 1400-1401) was a "Serb-Albanian-Bulgarian-Vlach" who conquered Arta from the Shpata family in 1400, holding it until late 1401, when the Shpatas regained the town.

== Life ==
Not much is known of him. In a Greek monastic chronicle, the Chronicle of Proclus and Comnenus (also known as the Chronicle of Ioannina) from the Panteleimon monastery at Ioannina, the last inclusion mentions: "October 29, on Wednesday (1400), Despot Shpatas enters Eternity (dies). Immediately afterwards, his brother Skurra holds Arta. After some days, the Serb-Albanian-Bulgarian-Vlach Bokoes (Vonko) attacked and expelled Skurra, and started to round up all the elders and imprisoned them in the fort, and he destroyed their possessions." He treated the citizens badly, and they called on the Republic of Venice for help.

By the end of 1401, Vonko had been driven out from Arta. Skurra did not retain the town, instead his nephew Muriq Shpata took over Arta and Skurra took over Angelokastron. No more is mentioned of him.

G. Schiro, who studied the genealogy of Shpata, assumed that the name (Bokoes in the original text) is a variant of Bua, based on linguistic data and the fact that Bua initially had the form of Buchia.

== Annotations ==
1. Name: His name appears in the "Chronicle of Ioannina" as Μποκόης (Bokoes) and has been transliterated as Vonko, or Vango,
2. The wide designation of his ethnicity (Serv-Alvanito-Voulgaro-Vlahos) gives the notion that there was a known symbiosis in that region in the 14th century, comparable with that of Macedonia.

== Notes ==
Preceded by Sgouros Spata	Ruler of Arta; 1400–1401	Succeeded by Maurice Spata
