= Hilario Doria =

Byzantine official

Hilario Doria (Greek: 'Ιλαρíων Tóρια, romanized: Hilarion Toria, Latin: Illarius Doria; died c. 1424) was a Byzantine court official, diplomat and translator of Genoese descent. Doria became influential in the reign of Emperor Manuel II Palaiologos (r. 1391–1425) through marrying the emperor's half-sister Zampia Palaiologina and was appointed as mesazon, one of the highest positions in the imperial administration. Doria had a distinguished career as a Byzantine diplomat in Western Europe; he worked with Pope Boniface IX on (ultimately unsuccessful) plans for organising a crusade and visited Richard II of England, who might have conferred a knighthood on him. Doria's career came to an end in 1423 when he was caught conspiring with Manuel's son Demetrios Palaiologos; Doria, Demetrios and their associates soon thereafter fled to Hungary, where Doria shortly thereafter died.

== Early life ==
Hilario Doria was originally from Genoa, part of the noble Doria family. His mother was Isabella Salvaigo. He lived in the Genoese colony of Caffa in Crimea for most of his early life. Doria first travelled to the Byzantine Empire in 1386 as part of a diplomatic mission to request aid against the Golden Horde.

He converted from Catholicism to Orthodoxy in April 1392, presumably in conjunction with his marriage to Princess Zampia Palaiologina, an illegitimate daughter of Emperor John V Palaiologos (r. 1341–1391). The marriage to Zampia made Doria into the brother-in-law of the incumbent emperor, Manuel II Palaiologos (r. 1391–1425). Doria rapidly rose through the ranks of Byzantine society and attained the court title of mesazon under Manuel, one of the highest positions in the imperial administration. In the late 1390s and early 1400s, Doria served as mesazon together with Demetrios Palaiologos Goudeles.

== Career ==
=== Byzantine diplomat ===
In the aftermath of the Ottoman victory against crusading forces at the Battle of Nicopolis on 25 September 1396, Pope Boniface IX intensified attempts to rally western aid for the Byzantine Empire. He sent his prelate Paolo de Bilenci, titular Bishop of Chalcedon, to preach the call for a crusade throughout Europe. Doria was sent by Manuel to the west in 1397 to aid in these efforts and explain the threats facing the empire. Doria first arrived in Florence, where he had little success since Manuel did not agree to grant Florence any commercial privileges. Doria then travelled to Rome to work with the papacy. He secured some funds raised by the papacy for the aid of Constantinople but the attempt to organise a crusade fizzled out after Boniface's and Paolo's relationship deteriorated. The papacy then enlisted Doria to go to Genoa and collect money owed to the church.

Doria remained in Western Europe until the middle of 1403, mainly residing in Italy and partaking in various diplomatic missions as a Byzantine representative. His wife Zampia remained in Constantinople during this time. In the winter of 1398, Doria attended Christmas celebrations hosted by Richard II of England at Lichfield, along with other foreign representatives and the English nobility. Richard knighted one of the Byzantine envoys present, presumably Doria. Doria left England in January 1399 and later in that year he was again an envoy to Pope Boniface IX. During this second visit to Boniface, Doria was tasked by the pope to be part of a commission that travelled around Italy and to England to raise money for a possible crusade. This mission achieved little; Doria quarrelled with Paolo de Bilenci and was at one point accused of money laundering. In February 1401, Doria translated into Latin a letter written by Manuel in England and addressed to all Christians.

Manuel received a delegation from Henry III of Castile in Constantinople on 28 October 1403, hosting them at the imperial palace. When the Spanish envoys a few days later requested an opportunity to see the relics that Constantinople was so famous for, Manuel happily obliged and appointed Doria as their guide. Doria took them to the Monastery of St. John of Petra, near the palace, where he impressed them with mosaics, architecture and the arm of John the Baptist. The visit fell short of expectations however since the box in which most of the other relics were kept was locked; Manuel had gone hunting and left the key with his wife, Empress Helena Dragaš, who had forgotten to send it over to the monastery. Doria returned with the envoys a few days later on a second visit, this time with the key, and showed them the remaining relics.

On 30 October 1418, Doria was a witness at the signing of a renewed agreement between Byzantium and Venice.

=== Conspiracy and escape to Hungary ===
In 1421 or 1422, Zampia Palaiologina Doria, the eldest daughter of Doria and Zampia, married the Ottoman prince and pretender Küçük Mustafa. This marriage, organized by the Byzantine court, may have upset and alienated Doria. In 1423, he is recorded to have conspired with Demetrios Palaiologos, a notoriously rebellious younger son of Manuel. The nature of the conspiracy is unclear but it was directed towards Manuel and his co-regent and heir John VIII Palaiologos and was uncovered in July. After their plot was uncovered, Doria, Demetrios and their associates took refuge in Galata, where Doria had Genoese connections. After a series of failed negotiations, Manuel accepted some demands put forth by Demetrios and appointed Doria as an official member of Demetrios's retinue in order to placate them.

Despite Manuel's attempt at reconciliation, Demetrios reportedly intended to flee to the court of Sultan Murad II but soon decided to travel to Hungary instead, accompanied by Doria and Doria's son-in-law George Izaoul (possibly the same person as Giorgio de' Buondelmonti). Doria accompanied Demetrios as either a diplomat or a fellow refugee. He distinguished himself in the service of King Sigismund of Hungary and was granted a diploma by the king in Visegrád on 18 January 1424. Doria died at some point during his stay in Hungary and may perhaps already have been dead by the time the diploma was granted.

== Children ==
Doria had at least three children, all daughters. At least two of his daughters were also daughters of Zampia.

- Manfredina Doria, married the scholar John Chrysoloras and had children with him. The identity of Manfredina's mother is disputed; she has variously been suggested to have been a daughter of Zampia or either illegitimate or from a previous marriage.
- Zampia Palaiologina Doria (fl. 1421/1422), married the Ottoman prince and pretender Küçük Mustafa in 1421 or 1422. The Byzantines bestowed the prestigious but empty title "Lady of Anatolia" (rather than the expected amirissa, "wife of the Emir") on her after the marriage.
- Another daughter (fl. 1421/1422), married George Izaoul in 1421 or 1422.
