= John Chrysoloras =

John Chrysoloras was a relative of Manuel Chrysoloras, (variously described as his nephew, brother or son) who like him had studied and taught at Constantinople and then migrated to Italy. There he was influential in spreading Greek letters in the West. He married Manfredina Doria, daughter of Hilario Doria. He was a patron and teacher of fellow Renaissance humanist Francesco Filelfo, who married his daughter Theodora (d.1441/1442).One of their daughters, Theodora, married Francis Filelfos.

== See also ==
- Greek scholars in the Renaissance
