= Nemanjić family tree (art) =

Family tree depicted in several Byzantine art frescoes

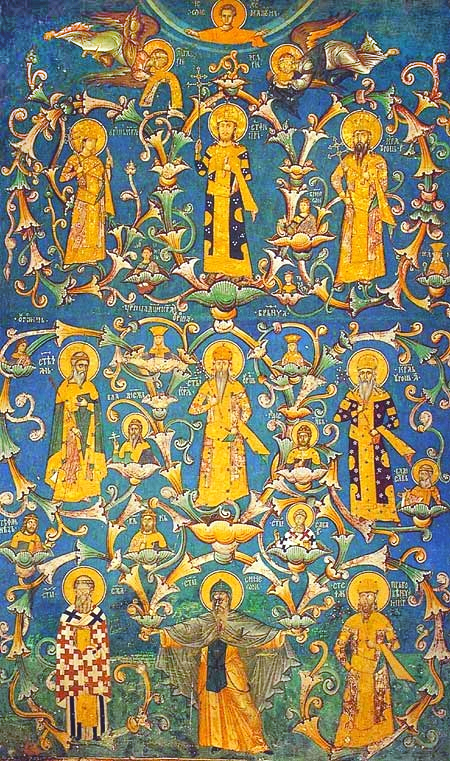
Nemanjić family tree from Visoki Dečani (ca. 1350).

The Nemanjić dynasty is depicted in a family tree composition in several specimen of Byzantine art frescoes in medieval Serbian Orthodox monasteries. The scheme is known as the Nemanjić family tree (loza Nemanjića). Examples include those of Gračanica (1321), Peć (ca. 1335), Visoki Dečani (ca. 1350), and Matejić (ca. 1360).

The Nemanjić family tree is also preserved from engravings, such as those of Studenica (1733), and Hristofor Žefarović (1741).

== Sources ==
- Đurić, Vojislav J. (1978). "Loza Nemanjića u starom srpskom slikarstvu". Zograf (8).
- Jevta Jevtović; Ante Sorić; Desanka Milošević; Anika Skovran (1985). Srednjovjekovna umjetnost Srba: iz muzeja, riznica, manastira i crkava. Muzejski Prostor.
- Radomir Ivančević; Mića Stojanović; Mirko Kambič (1967). Freske, ikone, mozaici: Frescoes, icons, mosaics. Spektar.
- Eva Haustein-Bartsch (1985). Der Nemanjidenstammbaum, Studien zur mittelalterlichen serbischen Herrscherikonographie. Rheinische Friedrich-Wilhelms-Universität zu Bonn.
- Vizantološki institut (2007). Recueil de travaux de l'Institut des études byzantines. Vol. 44. Vizantološki institut.
