= Đurađ I Balšić =

Member of the Balšić noble family

Đurađ I Balšić Ђурађ I Балшић I Gjergj I Balsha
- Lord of Zeta
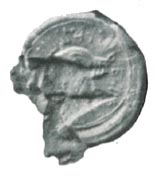
- Seal of the Balša brothers

Lord of Zeta
- Reign: 1362–1378
- Predecessor: Balša I
- Successor: Balša II
- Died: 13 January 1378; Shkodër, Lordship of Zeta
- Spouse: Olivera Mrnjavčević; Teodora Dejanović Dragaš
- Issue: Jelisaveta Balšić; Goisava Balšić; Jevdokija Balšić; Konstantin Balšić; Đurađ Balšić (illegitimate)
- House: Balšić
- Father: Balša I

Đurađ I Balšić (Serbian Cyrillic: Ђурађ I Балшић; Albanian: Gjergj I Balsha), also known as George or Gjergj, was the Lord of Zeta between 1362 and 13 January 1378. He was the eldest of the three sons of Balša I, and belonged to the Balšić family.

== Life ==
=== Early life and ancestry ===
Đurađ was the eldest son of Balša I, a petty nobleman who held one village during the rule of Serbian Emperor Stefan Uroš IV Dušan (r. 1331–1355) and was said to be "kin to Nemanja". The family started taking Lower Zeta sometime following the death of Dušan in 1355. In 1362 the brothers murdered Đuraš Ilijić who had held Upper Zeta, and were then recognized as oblastni gospodari (provincial lords) of Zeta in charters of Stefan Uroš V (r. 1355–1371).

=== Conflict with the Thopia ===
In 1363, Đurađ declared war against the Thopias, an Albanian noble family which controlled northern Albania. The Matarangos, an Albanian noble family which controlled southern Albania, were allied with the Balšićs as a result of a quarrel with the Thopias in the south. In the spring of 1364, Karl Thopia took Đurađ captive due to a skirmish, ending Zetan involvement in the war. Đurađ was held captive until 1366 when Republic of Ragusa mediated peace and procured his release. In 1367, Đurađ is mentioned as the "baron of maritime Serbia".

In January 1368, a Ragusan document reported that the three Balšić brothers: Stracimir, Đurađ and Balša II, were preparing for a campaign against Karl Thopia. They were camped on the Mati River, of which Karl's lands lay south of. The fighting was apparently small-scale as two months later, Karl had no difficulty capturing Dyrrhachium from the Angevins.

=== Conversion to Catholicism ===
In order to secure their rule, the Balšić brothers (especially Đurađ and Balša II) were already in 1369 ready to convert from Orthodoxy to Catholicism. According to Fine (1994), the brothers converted in order to further their coastal ambitions in 1368 or early 1369. They formally converted in 1369.

=== Conflict over Kotor ===
Hoping to acquire suzerainty over the town, Đurađ had waged war against Kotor in 1368. Kotor, as a result of warfare, was suffering economic decline. Accepting Zetan rule wasn't going to aid Kotor economically either. Kotor resisted Đurađ's assault after seeing the town of Bar paying an annual tribute of 2,000 ducats to Đurađ, previously paying 100 perpers under Serbian Imperial rule, expecting the same fate for Kotor. Kotor sought aid from Nikola Altomanović, but after his major defeat in Kosovo, he could provide little assistance. Kotor sought aid from the weak Stefan Uroš V and Venice. Neither provided much help as Venice was concerned that only their warships were on the Adriatic. In fact, Venice wrote to Uroš V in 1368, complaining that Serbia's armed ships were on the Adriatic, citing Bar, Budva nand Ulcinj to have them. They had also stated that this was also a violation of the Venetian-Serbian treaty and threatened to treat the ships as pirate vessels. However, Stefan Uroš V replied to that letter, stating that those ships that Venice were complaining about belonged to Đurađ I Balšić, the lord of Zeta.

Stefan Uroš V was unhappy with Đurađ's actions as they were directed against Kotor, which was under Stefan Uroš V's suzerainty. Concluding that Đurađ was a rebel, the Serbian court claimed no responsibility for Đurađ's actions that might violate the Venetian-Serbian treaty.

In 1369, Đurađ laid siege to Kotor, which, having no choice, turned to the Kingdom of Hungary for support and sought for Hungarian suzerainty. Hungary sent a nobleman from Zadar to hold Kotor. This action only increased Kotor's troubles, as it lost its trade privileges with Serbia for a time, causing a larger economic turmoil for Kotor. By spring 1370, probably through Venetian mediation, Đurađ had made peace with Kotor. However, in the same year, Nikola Altomanović attacked Kotor.

=== Alliance with the Republic of Ragusa ===
Zeta in time of Stracimir and Djuradj I Balsic (1372-1378). A) The territory of Balšić ; B) Temporary estates

In 1371, Đurađ announced to the Republic of Ragusa that he, Vukašin Mrnjavčević and his son, Marko, along with their armies, were in Scutari, preparing an attack on Nikola Altomanović. Ragusa assisted their campaign by providing ships to transport men and supplies, since their campaign was in Ragusa's interest. However, the campaign never took place as Vukašin and Marko went to aid Vukašin's brother, Jovan Uglješa, in a campaign against the Turks, which ended up in total disaster, Vukašin and Uglješa and their army being wiped out in the Battle of Maritsa. Serbian Prince Lazar Hrebeljanović and Bosnian Ban Tvrtko I allied themselves to defeat Nikola Altomanović. Desperate for a strong ally, Altomanović began negotiations with Đurađ. Most historians agree that in concluding negotiations, Đurađ gained the towns of Trebinje, Konavle and Dračevica (Herceg Novi) from Altomanović, possibly a bribe to remain neutral within the war. Other historians, however, follow Mavro Orbini's account and argue that Đurađ never concluded such an agreement, rather conquered the towns he gained from the agreement himself after Altomanović was defeated in 1373.

On 30 November 1373 the Balšić brothers issued an edict in the Republic of Ragusa that confirmed the laws of Emperor Stefan Uroš V and gave privileges to Ragusan traders, including imposed taxes. It also included a unique clause, recognizing the sovereignty and territorial integrity of the Serbian Empire despite being without an Emperor for years and any form of strong centralized authority, a note that if anyone would become the new sovereign Emperor of the Serbs and the Serbian nobility and lands (ако тко буде цар господин Србљем и властелом у земљи српској), all the points shall be transferred from the Balšićs to him. Đurađ I's logotet Vitko was the witness, as well as Dragaš Kosačić.

=== Later reign ===
In 1375, Lazar Hrebeljanović and Đurađ convened the state assembly (sabor) during which Jefrem was chosen as Serbian Patriarch.

After the Battle of Maritsa, Marko, the son of Vukašin Mrnjavčević, was crowned king and gained his father's lands. However, his friendship with the Balšićs soon crumbled. This was a result of Đurađ, in 1371, expelling his first wife Olivera, Marko's sister, and took Prizren from Marko. Lazar Hrebeljanović, prince of Moravian Serbia, conquered Pristina in the same year. Đurađ took Peja/Peć a year later, stripping most of Marko's lands north of Šar mountain.

=== Death and succession ===
Đurađ I died on 13 January 1378 in Skadar. However, recent studies now conclude that Đurađ died in 1379 rather than in 1378. The rule of Zeta was passed down to his younger brother, Balša II. Đurađ's death caused quite a stir between Zeta's neighbours. Bosnian Ban Tvrtko I annexed Đurađ's territories bordering Dubrovnik in 1377, along with the remainder of Đurađ's coastal lands between the Bay of Kotor and the land previously annexed in 1377 at the time of his death. Tvrtko secured these possessions through Đurađ's death, free of worry of any counter-attack.

Vuk Branković also took this opportunity to gain Đurađ's land. Branković sent his forces into Metohija and seized Prizren, along with the rest of Đurađ's holdings in the region.

== Titles ==
- gospodin (господин, "lord").
- "Maritime Baron of Serbia" (приморски барон Србије), 1367.

== Family ==
Đurađ I was married to two women: Olivera Mrnjavčević (daughter of Vukašin Mrnjavčević) before 1364 and Teodora Dejanović (daughter of despot Dejan) after 1371. He had the following issue:

- Jelisaveta (Elisabeta) (d. 1443)
- Gojslava (Goisava) (d. 1398), married Radič Sanković, lord of Nevesinje, Popovo Polje and Konavli
- Jevdokija (Eudokia), married to Esau de' Buondelmonti, despot of Epirus
- Konstantin (Košta) (d. 1402), local Zetan lord
- Đurađ/Gjergj (illegitimate), his son Stefan Strez Balšić married Vlajka Kastrioti (Skanderbeg's sister) and had two sons: Ivan and Gojko who in 1444 were among the founders of the League of Lezhë.

== See also ==
- House of Balšić
- Battle of Maritsa
- Lordship of Zeta

Đurađ I Balšić Balšić noble family Born: ? Died: 1378
Regnal titles
Preceded by Balša I	Ruler of Zeta; 1362 – 13 January 1378	Succeeded by Balša II
