= Sgouros Spata =

Sgouros Shpata (Albanian: Skurra Bua Shpata; fl. 1399–1403) was the Lord of Arta briefly in 1400, and the Lord of Angelokastron from 1401 until his death in 1403, during warfare in a civil war.

== Life ==
Born in the first half of the 14th century in Epirus to Pietro Bua Shpata the lord of Angelokastron and Delvina (1354). Sgouros was a descendant of both Bua and Shpata tribes. Shortly before Gjin Bua Shpata died on 29 October (1399, according to Nicol; 1400 according to others), he appointed his brother, Skurra, ruler of Naupactus, as his successor as the despot of Arta. A few days after Skurra took over Arta, however, the town was captured by the adventurer Vonko. While Skurra fled to Angelokastron, a short time after, possibly as early as December 1399 (or by the end of 1401), Muriq Shpata, his grandnephew, managed to evict Vonko from Arta and took over the governance of the city himself, while Skurra thus took over governance of Angelokastron.

In 1402/3, Muriq came to Skurra's aid when the latter was besieged at Angelokastron by the forces of Carlo I Tocco. The attack, under Carlo's general Galasso Peccatore, was repulsed, but Skurra died soon after, from wounds suffered in the war, leaving his possessions to his son Pal Bua Shpata.

== Aftermath ==
Skurra was succeeded by his son Pal, who became an Ottoman vassal and was aided with a contingent that was defeated by Tocco in 1406, after the latter had turned on the offensive, Angelokastron was ceded to the Turks and Pal retired to Naupaktos, however he sold it in 1407 to the Republic of Venice. Because of Pal withdrawal, Muriq Shpata and Tocco divided Aetolia and Acarnania between themselves. In 1408, Tocco holds Angelokastron.

== Annotations ==
1. His name according to a contemporary fresco in the church of Panagia Paregoritissa in Arta was Sgouros Spatas (ϹΓΟΥΡΟϹ ϹΠΑΤΑϹ), while it is mostly spelled Sgouros Spata in modern sources. His given name has also been spelled Zgur.

Preceded by John Spata	Despot of Arta; 1400	Succeeded by Vonko
Preceded by ?	Lord of Angelokastron; 1401-1403	Succeeded by Paul Spata
