= Küçük Mustafa =

Ottoman prince, son of Sultan Mehmed I

- Born: c. 1408
- Died: c. 1423 (aged 14–15); Ottoman Empire
- Spouse: Zampia Palaiologina Doria
- Father: Mehmed I
- Religion: Sunni Islam

Küçük Mustafa ("Mustafa the Small" or "Mustafa the Little" or "Mustafa the Young"; c. 1408 – 1423) was an Ottoman prince (Turkish: şehzade) who fought to gain control of the throne of the Ottoman Empire in 1422. It was used by the Ottoman chroniclers to distinguish him from his uncle Mustafa Çelebi, who also fought for the throne.

== Background ==
Mustafa was born in 1408. He was the second son of Mehmed I. In the early years of the Ottoman Empire, all princes were required to work as provincial (sanjak) governors as a part of their training. Young princes were accompanied by experienced statesmen. Mustafa's sanjak was Hamideli (roughly modern Isparta in Turkey). But after the death of his father, fearing for his life at the hands of his elder brother, he escaped to the rival Turkish beylik Karamanid territory. In Karaman, he was encouraged by an Ottoman pasha named Şaraptar İlyas to rebel against his elder brother, new sultan Murad II.

Mustafa was supported by the Byzantine Empire and married into the imperial family. In 1421 or 1422 he married Zampia Palaiologina Doria, daughter of Zampia Palaiologina who in turn was an illegitimate daughter of Emperor John V Palaiologos (r. 1341–1391).

== The rebellion ==
Immediately after his coronation, Murat was occupied with the rebellion of his uncle Mustafa Çelebi. After defeating Mustafa, Murat laid siege to the Byzantine capital Constantinople (modern Istanbul) to punish the Byzantine Empire for supporting Mustafa. Küçük Mustafa saw his chance to rebel. Supported with troops from Karaman, he began capturing the Anatolian territories of the Ottoman Empire. The Byzantine emperor, seeing this rebellion as a chance for relief from the siege, also supported the rebellion. Although unsuccessful in the siege of Bursa, the co-capital of the empire, Küçük Mustafa captured İznik (Nicaea of antiquity), another important city in the Anatolia.

== End of the rebellion ==
After hearing the news of the rebellion, Murat lifted the siege on Constantinople and returned to Anatolia. He also corresponded with Şaraptar İlyas secretly. İlyas betrayed Küçük Mustafa and changed sides, and İznik was easily captured by Murat's forces. Although Mustafa tried to escape, he was soon arrested and executed.
