= Jevdokija Balšić =

Serbian regent (died after 1428)

Jevdokija Balšić Evdokia Balsha
- Regent of Ioannina
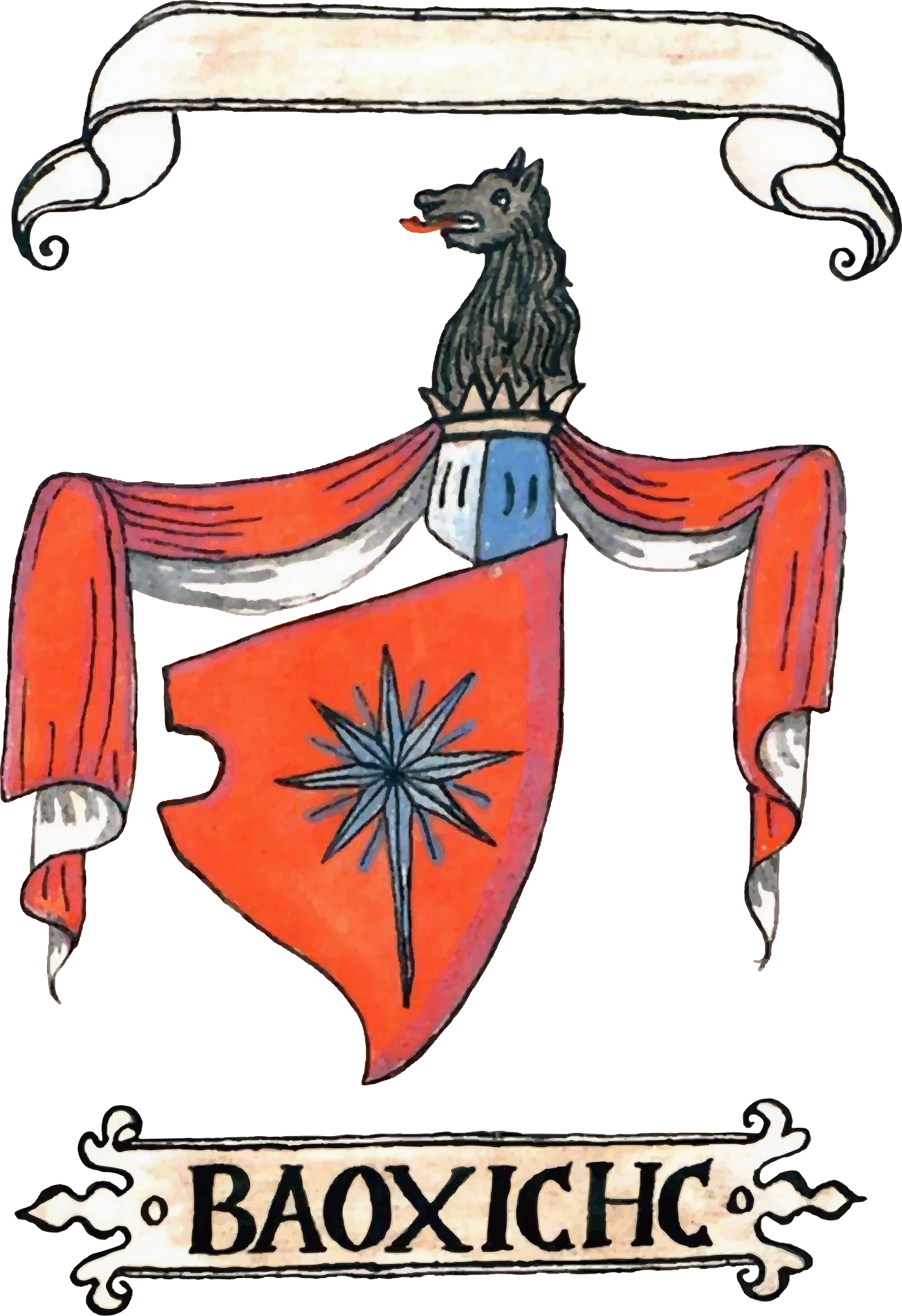
- Balsha coat of arms
- Died: after 1428
- Noble family: Balšić
- Spouse: Esau de' Buondelmonti
- Issue: Giorgio de' Buondelmonti
- Father: Đurađ I Balšić
- Mother: Theodora Dejanović

Jevdokija Balšić (Serbian Cyrillic: Јевдокија Балшић; Albanian: Evdokia Balsha) (died after 1428) was a Zetan aristocrat and regent. She was the wife of Esau de' Buondelmonti, despot of Ioannina. She was regent of Ioannina during the minority of her son in 1411.

== Life ==
Jevdokija Balšić was the daughter of Đurađ I Balšić, lord of Zeta, and Theodora Dejanović from noble house of Dejanović, daughter Dejan, despot of Kumanovo. She is a half-sister of Mrkša Žarković and cousin of Ruđina Balšić, princess of Valona. Around 1402, Esau de' Buondelmonti, despot of Ioannina, got divorce of his second wife Irene Spata and he married with Jevdokija.

In 1411, they had a son, Giorgio. In that year, Esau died and was succeeded by Giorgio. Jevdokija tried to take the control of Ioannina in the name of her son. However, she was unpopular among the nobility of Ioannina. When she wanted to get married with a Serbian noble, she was deposed by the nobility of Ioannina; they gave the city to Carlo I Tocco, Count Palatine of Cephalonia and Zakynthos and Esau’s nephew.

After she was expelled, Jevdokija went to the court of the Albanian John Zenevisi, prince of Gjirokastër. Then, she traveled to Ragusa, where she lived with Giorgio until her dead after 1428.

== Sources ==
- Fine, John V. A. (1994) [1987]. The Late Medieval Balkans: A Critical Survey from the Late Twelfth Century to the Ottoman Conquest. Ann Arbor, Michigan: University of Michigan Press. ISBN 978-0-472-10079-8.
- Kašanin, Milan (1975). Srpska književnost u srednjem veku (in Serbian). Prosveta.
- Nicol, Donald MacGillivray (2010). The Despotate of Epiros 1267–1479: A Contribution to the History of Greece in the Middle Ages. Cambridge: Cambridge University Press. ISBN 978-0-521-13089-9.
- Trapp, Erich; Beyer, Hans-Veit; Walther, Rainer; Sturm-Schnabl, Katja; Kislinger, Ewald; Leontiadis, Ioannis; Kaplaneres, Sokrates (1976–1996). Prosopographisches Lexikon der Palaiologenzeit (in German). Vienna: Verlag der Österreichischen Akademie der Wissenschaften. ISBN 3-7001-3003-1.
- Zečević, Nada (2014). The Tocco of the Greek Realm: Nobility, Power and Migration in Latin Greece (14th – 15th Centuries). Belgrade: Makart. ISBN 978-8687115118.
