= Esau de' Buondelmonti =

- Despot
- Arms of Esau de' Buondelmonti as Despot of Ioannina

Ruler of Epirus
- Reign: 1385–1411
- Predecessor: Maria Angelina
- Successor: Giorgio de' Buondelmonti
- Died: 6 February 1411
- Spouse: Maria Angelina Doukaina Palaiologina; Irene Shpata; Jevdokija Balšić
- Issue: Maddalena de' Buondelmonti; Giorgio de' Buondelmonti
- House: Buondelmonti
- Father: Manente Buondelmonti
- Mother: Lapa Acciaiuoli
- Religion: Roman Catholicism

Esau de' Buondelmonti (Greek: Ησαύ Μπουοντελμόντ) was the ruler of Ioannina and its surrounding area (central Epirus) from 1385 until his death in 1411, with the Byzantine title of despot.

== Life ==
Esau was the son of the Florentine nobleman Manente Buondelmonti and his wife, Lapa Acciaiuoli, sister of Niccolò Acciaiuoli of Corinth. Esau had come to Greece to seek success like his Acciaiuoli kinsmen, but in 1379 he had been captured in battle against Thomas Preljubović of Epirus. After he spent several years of captivity, Esau succeeded his captor by marrying the latter's widow, Maria Angelina Doukaina Palaiologina in February 1385.

Esau reversed the unpopular policies of the tyrannical Thomas, recalling the exiled nobles and reinstating Matthew, the bishop of Ioannina. The new ruler pursued a pacifying policy, and sought accommodation with both the Albanian clans and the Byzantine Empire. In 1386 a Byzantine embassy arrived at Ioannina and invested Esau with the court dignity of despotes (despot). Although Esau was fully independent from Constantinople, this recognition helped strengthen and legitimize his position.

Esau found it difficult, however, to reach an agreement with the Albanians. In 1385 Gjin Bua Shpata, despot of Arta, advanced on Ioannina, but Esau managed to prepare the defences so efficiently, that the Albanian leader withdrew. Esau was forced to follow Thomas' policy of seeking Ottoman support against the Albanians, going to the court of Sultan Murad I to pay homage in 1386. This alliance brought a respite to the fighting in Epirus, but the conflict flamed up again after the Battle of Kosovo and death of Murad in 1389. Once again Ioannina was threatened, and once again Esau succeeded in weathering the storm by seeking and obtaining Ottoman support.

Returning to Ioannina after 14 months (1399–1400) at the Ottoman court under Bayezid I, Esau was supported by the Ottoman commander Evrenos and quickly defeated the Albanians. This bought him four years of peace interrupted only at the end by a conflict with Venice over a disputed port. The death of Maria in December 1394 was followed by a new conflict with Gjin Bua Shpata, which was resolved through diplomacy. In January 1396 Esau married Shpata's daughter Irene as part of the peace settlement. But peace remained elusive. No longer needing Turkish support, Esau had clashed with the Turks and defeated them, becoming increasingly confident in his power.

In 1399 Esau, supported by some Albanian clans, marched against his wife's brother-in-law Gjon Zenebishi of Gjirokastër. Now Esau was routed and captured, and much of his land was occupied by Zenebishi. The neighboring magnates determined to restore the captured despotes and secured Venetian intercession in his favor. Esau returned to Ioannina in 1400, and reigned on in relative peace until his death on February 6, 1411.

== Family ==
Esau does not appear to have had children by his first wife Maria Angelina Doukaina Palaiologina. However, with his second wife, Irene Shpata, and his third wife Jevdokija Balšić he had children, including:

- Maddalena de' Buondelmonti, died in 1402
- Giorgio de' Buondelmonti, who succeeded as briefly as ruler of Ioannina, before he was deposed by the local nobility, who surrendered their city to Carlo I Tocco.

== Bibliography ==
- Fine, John V. A., Jr. (1994) [1987]. The Late Medieval Balkans: A Critical Survey from the Late Twelfth Century to the Ottoman Conquest. Ann Arbor, Michigan: University of Michigan Press. ISBN 978-0-472-10079-8.
- Kazhdan, Alexander, ed. (1991). The Oxford Dictionary of Byzantium. Oxford and New York: Oxford University Press. ISBN 0-19-504652-8.
- Miller, William (1908). The Latins in the Levant: A History of Frankish Greece (1204–1566). London: John Murray.
- Nicol, Donald M. (1984). The Despotate of Epiros, 1267–1479: A Contribution to the History of Greece in the Middle Ages. Cambridge: Cambridge University Press. ISBN 978-0-521-13089-9.
- Soulis, George Christos (1984), The Serbs and Byzantium during the reign of Tsar Stephen Dušan (1331–1355) and his successors, Dumbarton Oaks, ISBN 0-88402-137-8

Preceded by Maria	Ruler of Epirus; 1385–1411	Succeeded by Giorgio
