= List of wars involving Albania =

This is a list of wars that Albanian states and Albanian armed forces have been involved in.

Albanian victory
Albanian defeat
Another result (e.g. a treaty or peace without a clear result, status quo ante bellum, result of civil war or internal conflict, result unknown, mixed results, stalemate, ceasefire or indecisive)
Ongoing conflict

== Medieval era ==
Conflict	Combatant 1	Combatant 2	Result
Basilakes rebellion (1078)	Nikephoros Basilakes: Arbanitai soldiers (Albanian); Bulgarian soldiers; Roman soldiers; Frankish (Italian) mercenaries; Varangian mercenaries; Pecheneg mercenaries	Byzantine Empire	Defeat: Basilakes' forces included veteran Roman, Bulgarian, Albanian, Frankish, Varangian and Pecheneg troops; Basilakes was defeated by Alexios Komnenos near the Vardar River; Basilakes fled to Thessaloniki, where he was captured by his own soldiers; The rebellion was suppressed in 1078
War of Michael II against the Empire of Nicaea (1252–1253)	Principality of Arbanon; Despotate of Epirus	Empire of Nicaea	Nicaean victory: Golem of Kruja initially supported Michael II against the Nicaean forces.; Golem and his soldiers subsequently surrendered to John III Vatatzes.; The defection of Golem and other Epirote leaders helped force Michael II to come to terms with Vatatzes.; The resulting settlement placed Kruja under Nicaean suzerainty.
Rebellion of Arbanon (1257–1259)	Principality of Arbanon	Empire of Nicaea	Inconclusive: Arbanon rebels initially defeat Nicaean forces; The revolt is put under control by 1259; Albanian nobles rebel again in 1260-1270 around Durrës
Byzantine–Angevin War (1274–1281)	Kingdom of Albania; Kingdom of Sicily	(Byzantine Empire) Byzantine Empire; Albanian nobility	Defeat: Angevin forces were largely expelled from the Albanian interior following the Siege of Berat; Andrea I Muzaka established de facto independent territorial rule in the Myzeqe area
Stefan Milutin's invasion of Northern Albania (1296–1299)	Albanian nobility Byzantine Empire	Kingdom of Serbia	Defeat: Serbian victory; The Serbian army attacks Northern Albania in 1296 with the goal of capturing the Mat–Ohrid line and triumphs at the Battle of Durrës, but Milutin's advance toward Ohrid is halted by Progonos Sgouros.; Peace is achieved in 1299; the marriage with Simonida leads to the Kingdom of Serbia gaining the Mat–Ohrid line and the territory north of Durrës.; Following the armistice, the Albanian noble families reform their alliances with the Angevins.
Byzantine civil war of 1341–1347	(Byzantine Empire) John V Palaiologos; Regents: (Byzantine Empire) Anna of Savoy (Byzantine Empire) John XIV Kalekas (Byzantine Empire) Alexios Apokaukos; Allies: Zealots of Thessalonica (Serbian Empire) Serbia (1343–1347); Bulgaria; Principality of Karvuna	(Byzantine Empire) John VI Kantakouzenos; Allies: (Serbian Empire) Serbia (1342–1343); Beylik of Aydin (1342/3–1345) (Ottoman Empire) Ottoman beylik (1345–1347); Beylik of Saruhan; Principality of Albania; Principality of Muzaka	Mixed Results: Kantakouzenos victory; John VI Kantakouzenos defeats regents; Recognized as senior emperor; Serbia gained Macedonia and Albania, and soon after Epirus and Thessaly, establishing the Serbian Empire; Bulgaria gains northern Thrace
Muzaka-Serbian Conflict (1350–1370)	Albanian Muzaka family Support: (Byzantine Empire) Byzantine Empire; Albanian Gropa family Angevins; Balšić family	Serbian Empire Principality of Valona	Albanian Victory: Muzaka forces capture Myzeqe, Berat, Tomorricë, Skrapar, Këlcyrë, Përmet, Opar, Devoll, Kolonjë and Kastoria.
Albanian-Anjou Conflict (1358–1383)	Principality of Albania	Angevin Kingdom of Naples Navarrese Company Kingdom of Navarre	Albanian victory: The Principality of Albania captures Durrës.; End of the Angevin Kingdom of Albania.
Albanian-Epirote War of 1359	Albanian Losha Family and Shpata Family	Despotate of Epirus	Victory: An Epirote invasion force is badly defeated by the Albanians at the Battle of Achelous and the Epirote leader, Nikephoros II Orsini, is killed.; Albanians invade Epirus. Pjetër Losha forms the Despotate of Arta and Gjin Bua Shpata forms the Despotate of Angelokastron and Lepanto.; Serbs take control of the rest of Epirus.
Thopian-Zetan War (1363–64)	Principality of Albania	Principality of Zeta; Principality of Mataranga	Victory: Gjergj I Balsha, allied with the Mataranga family go to war against Karl Thopia.; Gjergj I Balsha gets captured by Karl Thopia and gets held until 1366 when the Republic of Ragusa mediated peace.
Durrës Expedition (1376)	Principality of Albania	Navarrese Company Kingdom of Navarre Kingdom of France	Defeat: Navarrese victory.; Louis of Évreux captures Durrës.; Reestablishment of the Kingdom of Albania.
Knights Hospitaller invasion of Despotate of Arta (1378)	Despotate of Arta	Knights Hospitaller	Victory: Knights Hospitaller capture Nafpaktos and Vonitsa; The Gjin Bua Shpata ambushed the Knights Hospitaller Army and captured Grand Master Juan Fernández de Heredia and holds him for ransom; Gjin Bua Shpata recaptures Nafpaktos
Albanian-Epirote War (1381–84)	Despotate of Arta	Despotate of Epirus in Ioannina; Ottoman Empire	Defeat: Epirote victory; Thomas Preljubović secures Ottoman and Frankish auxiliary forces to launch a successful offensive against the Despotate of Arta.; Epirus captures multiple fortresses and territories, halting the Albanian pressure on Ioannina, though the Mazarakii tribe maintains their defense.; Fearing further Ottoman incursions, Gjin Bua Shpata sues for peace, securing a ceasefire through a marriage alliance.
Albanian-Epirote War of 1385	Despotate of Arta	Despotate of Epirus	Ceasefire: Albanians besiege Ioannina.; Shpata withdraws due to strong city defences. The two sides later negotiate peace.
Thopian-Zetan War (1385)	Principality of Albania; Ottoman Empire	Principality of Zeta	Victory: Albanian - Ottoman forces defeat Zetan forces.; Balsha II is killed in the Battle of Savra.
Albanian-Epirote War of 1389–90	Despotate of Arta (all four battles); Malakasi Tribe (second battle)	Despotate of Epirus (all four battles); Thessaly (second battle); Ottoman Empire (third and fourth battles)	Defeat: Albanian and Aromanian forces are defeated in four battles against Epirote, Thessalian and Ottoman forces around Jannina.; Albanian forces withdraw into the surrounding mountains. Peace lasts from 1391–1394.
Venetian-Albanian War (1392)	Princedom of Albania	Republic of Venice	Defeat: Venice invades and successfully captures Durrës from the Princedom.
Civil war of the Despotate of Arta (1401–08) (late 1401 – 1408)	1401–1403: Despotate of Arta supported by Skurra Bua Shpata and Muriq Shpata 1403–1407: Despotate of Arta: Forces loyal to Pal Shpata; Forces loyal to Maurice Shpata; Ottoman Empire (1406 only); 1407–1408: Despotate of Arta (supported by Muriq Shpata)	County palatine of Cephalonia and Zakynthos	Sgouros and Paul are defeated, Maurice is victorious: Carlo I Tocco invades Skurra Bua Shpata's area of the Despotate of Arta.; Muriq reinforces Skurra but the latter is killed in battle by the Epirotes in 1403.; Skurras' son, Pal, seeks Ottoman aid, ceding Angelokastron to the Ottoman Empire. However, only a small Ottoman contingent is sent which is defeated in battle in 1406.; Pal retreats from most of his areas the same year and cedes Naupaktos to Venice in 1407.; Tocco captures Angelokastron from the Ottomans in 1408.; A Tocco attack against the city of Arta is repelled by Albanians under Muriq in 1408.
Zenebishi-Venetian war (1402–1413)	Principality of Gjirokastër	Republic of Venice	Defeat: Most of the mainland territories across from the Venetian possession of Corfu were taken.
First Scutari War (early 1405 – January 1413)	Balšići Lordship of Zeta; Crnojević family Albanian Humoj family Serb peasants Albanian peasants Albanian Zaharia family (late 1412 – early 1413)	Republic of Venice; Zaharia family (early 1405 – late 1412); Albanian Jonima family	Mixed results: A local rebellion breaks out in the Shkodër area in early 1405. The Balšići intervene in favour of the rebels and capture all of the region including Drivast, but fail to capture Rozafa Castle in Shkodër.; The Venetians retake Drivast in August 1405, followed by the Zetan coastal towns of Bar, Ulcinj and Budva.; Peace is negotiated in 1409 however the Venetians broke the peace agreement shortly afterwards, resulting in the Zetans resuming war in early 1410. Shkodër is besieged.; Peace is made in early 1413 although both sides are unsatisfied.
Second Thopia-Muzaka War (late 1411)	Albanian Thopia family: Princedom of Albania	Muzaka family: Muzaka Lordship	Muzaka Victory: Forces under Niketa Thopia are heavily defeated during a skirmish with forces under Theodor Corona Musachi.; Niketa Thopia is captured, and only released after ceding territory around the Shkumbin River to the Muzaka family.
Albanian invasion of Epirus (1411–1412)	Albanian Zenebishi Family: Principality of Gjirokastër; Albanian Shpata Family: Despotate of Arta	Despotate of Epirus; Greeks of Ioannina	Victory: Albanians invade Epirus following the expulsion of Eudocia Balsic from Ioannina and the establishment of Carolo Tocco.; Epirote forces are defeated in battle, however Albanian forces fail to take Ioannina.
Ottoman-Gjirokastër War (1414)	Albanian Zenebishi Family: Principality of Gjirokastër	Ottoman Empire	Defeat: Ottomans conquer the territory of the Principality.; Ruler of the Principality, Gjon Zenebishi, goes into exile in Corfu.
Albanian-Epirote War of 1416 (October 1416)	Despotate of Arta	Despotate of Epirus	Defeat: The Shpata's suffer defeat at a battle near Nicopolis.; Jakob Bua Shpata, ruler of the Despotate of Arta, is killed in an ambush at Bompliana in October 1416.; Following the death of Jakob Epirote forces successfully invade and annex the territory previously under control by Shpata clan.
Second Ottoman-Gjirokastër War (1418)	Albanian Zenebishi Family: Principality of Gjirokastër	Ottoman Empire	Defeat: Ottomans successfully besiege Gjirokastër and reconquer the territory of the Principality.; Ruler of the Principality, Depë Zenebishi, goes into exile in Corfu.
Second Scutari War (1419–23)	Zeta; Serbian Despotate (after 1421); Albanian nobility: Dukagjini Family; Kastrioti family; Humoj family; Zaharia family	Republic of Venice	Inconclusive: Venice captured Ulcinj, Grbalj, and territory of Paštrovići, with Kotor deciding to accept Venetian suzerainty; Serbian Despotate captured Drivast and returned its suzerainty over Bar, Budva, and Luštica
Albanian Revolt (1432–36)	Albanian rebels: Arianiti family; Thopia family; Kastrioti family (until Summer 1433); Zenebishi family (from Late 1432); Dukagjini family (from Summer 1433)	Ottoman Empire Support: Venice	Defeat: Ottoman victory; Albanian rebels led by Andrea Thopia attack Ottomans in Central Albania in 1432, beginning the revolt. Krujë is unsuccessfully besieged.; Rebels capture Vlorë in May 1432. An Ottoman invasion force of 10,000 men is defeated in the Winter of 1432 by forces of Gjergj Arianiti at the Central valley of the Shkumbin.; Depë Zenebishi joins the revolt in late 1432, capturing Këlcyrë, Zagorie and Pogon that year.; Zenebishi's forces besiege Gjirokastër, the capital of the Sanjak of Albania, between late 1432 until early 1433 but are defeated by the Ottomans.; Ottoman forces pillage Kanina and Yannina in the Summer of 1433 and then invade Gjon Kastrioti's lands, bringing him out of the war.; Nikollë Dukagjini rebels in Summer 1433 and captures areas of the former Principality of Dukagjini including Dagnum.; Zenebishi's forces besiege Kanina.; Ottomans recapture Vlorë in May 1434.; A second Ottoman invasion force is defeated, again by Gjergj Arianiti, in South-Central Albania, August 1434.; With Venetian aid, Ottomans take back Dagnum in 1435.; A third Ottoman invasion force is defeated by Gjergj Arianiti in April 1435, ending hostilities until 1436.; Attempts are made to ally the Albanian rebels with the Holy Roman Empire by Sigismund, however talks end when a fourth Ottoman invasion force subdues Albania in mid-1436, committing massacres against the civilian population and fully restoring Ottoman rule.
Albanian-Ottoman wars (1443–1479)	1443–44: Kastrioti Family; Arianiti Family 1444–46: League of Lezhë 1446–50: League of Lezhë; Angevin Kingdom of Naples: State of Arianiti; 1450–51: Albanians under Skanderbeg; Muzaka Lordship Angevin Kingdom of Naples: State of Arianiti; 1451–54: Angevin Kingdom of Naples: Principality of Kastrioti; State of Arianiti; Muzaka Lordship; 1454–56: Angevin Kingdom of Naples: Principality of Kastrioti; Principality of Dukagjini; Muzaka Lordship; 1456–68: Angevin Kingdom of Naples: Principality of Kastrioti; Principality of Dukagjini; Muzaka Lordship; Republic of Venice: State of Arianiti; 1468–78: Angevin Kingdom of Naples: Principality of Kastrioti; Principality of Dukagjini; 1478–79: Angevin Kingdom of Naples: Principality of Dukagjini; Republic of Venice: State of Arianiti; Albanian resistance forces; Lordship of Zeta (Siege of Shkodra only)	1443–44: Ottoman Empire: Muzaka Lordship; 1444–46: Ottoman Empire 1446–50: Ottoman Empire 1450–51: Ottoman Empire; Principality of Dukagjini; State of Arianiti 1451–54: Ottoman Empire: Principality of Dukagjini; 1454–56: Ottoman Empire: State of Arianiti; 1456–68: Ottoman Empire 1468–78: Ottoman Empire: Muzaka Lordship; 1478–79: Ottoman Empire: Muzaka Lordship	Ottoman victory: The Ottomans are defeated in numerous battles by the Albanians under Skanderbeg, but the resistance weakens after his death in 1468.; Krujë falls in 1478 after three previous failed sieges (1450, 1466 and 1467).; Shkodër falls in 1479, leading to the Ottoman conquest of most of Albania.
Albanian–Venetian War (December 1447 – October 1448)	League of Lezhë	Republic of Venice; Ottoman Empire	Victory: The League of Lezhë besieges Dagnum and Durazzo, triggering an un-unified retaliation by Venice and the Ottoman Empire.; Skanderbeg decisively defeats the Venetian forces at the River Drin and routs an Ottoman expeditionary force at the Battle of Oranik.; Venice opens peace negotiations; the treaty allows Venice to keep Dagnum but forces them to cede all territory on the Albanian side of the Drin.; Skanderbeg receives an annual pension and trade privileges for his allies from Venice.
Ottoman invasion of Albania (1452)	League of Lezhë	Ottoman Empire	Albanian victory: Ottoman forces invade Albania under Mehmed II; Skanderbeg defeats Hamza Pasha at the Battle of Modrič and captures him; Skanderbeg defeats Tahip Pasha at the Battle of Meçad, where Tahip Pasha is killed; The Ottoman invasion is repulsed
Morea revolt of 1453–1454	Albanian rebels Greek rebels Latin rebels	Despotate of the Morea; Ottoman Empire	Rebel defeat: Albanian rebels under Peter Bua rise against the rulers of the Despotate of the Morea; Greek and Latin rebels join the uprising; Ottoman forces under Turahanoğlu Ömer Bey intervene in support of the Palaiologoi; The revolt is suppressed in 1454
Ottoman–Venetian War (1463–1479)	Republic of Venice; Papal States; League of Lezhë; Principality of Zeta; Greek rebels (including Maniots)	Ottoman Empire	Ottoman victory, Treaty of Constantinople (1479)

== Ottoman era ==
Conflict	Combatant 1	Combatant 2	Result
Cretan War (1645–1669) (1645–1669)	Republic of Venice Knights of Malta; Papal States; France; Greek revolutionaries (including Maniots); Albanian Christian rebels	Ottoman Empire	Ottoman victory: Albanian Catholics participated in anti-Ottoman rebellions with Venetian support during the war.; Venice attempted to encourage a larger uprising among Albanian Christians in 1649, but the attempt failed.; The war ended with the fall of Candia and an Ottoman victory.
Süleyman's invasions of Montenegro (1685–1692)	Sanjak of Scutari	Montenegro; Republic of Venice	Scutari victory: Süleyman Pasha reasserts his claim over the Montenegro vilayet.; Retreat of Venetian forces.
First Scutari-Berat War	Pashalik of Scutari	(Ottoman Empire) Pashalik of Berat Pashalik of Yanina	Scutari victory: Shkodran forces recapture the Sanjak of Durrës
Scutari invasion of Montenegro (1785)	Pashalik of Scutari	Prince-Bishopric of Montenegro: Montenegrin Nikšići tribe; Montenegrin Paštrovići tribe; Montenegrin Bjelice tribe	Victory: Albanian Shkodran forces under Kara Mahmud Pasha invade Montenegro.; Albanian forces pass through the territories of the Nikšići, Paštrovići and Bjelice.; The Montenegrin coastline is reached and Cetinje is burnt down.
First Scutari-Ottoman War	Pashalik of Scutari	Ottoman Empire: Pashalik of Yanina; Bosnia eyalet; Rumelia Eyalet	Victory: Pashalik of Scutari loses large parts of its territories held outside of the Sanjak of Scutari; Ottomans fail to overthrow Kara Mahmud Pasha, after decisive defeat in the Siege of Shkodër; Outbreak of the Russo-Turkish War in 1787 and the Austro-Turkish War in 1788 forces Ottoman Authorities to withdraw from further Operations against Kara Mahmud Pasha; After Imperial pardon Kara Mahmud Pasha joins the Ottomans against the Austrians in the Austro-Turkish War
Souliote War (1789–1793)	Pashalik of Yanina	Albanian Souliotes	Souliote Victory: Souliote forces defeat Ali Pasha
Second Scutari-Ottoman War (1795)	Pashalik of Scutari	Ottoman Empire	Albanian Victory: In 1795 Kara Mahmud Pasha conquered parts of Southern Albania and much of Kosovo.; Kara Mahmud Pasha defeated Ottoman forces in Prizren and annexed the Sanjak by installing his own nephew as governor of the sanjak.; Ottomans besieged Shkodra and retreated after being defeated by Kara Mahmud Pasha, then returned but again failed to complete the siege.
Second Scutari invasion of Montenegro (Early 1796–September 1796)	Pashalik of Scutari	Prince-Bishopric of Montenegro: Serbian Piperi Tribe; Serbian Bjelopavlići Tribe	Defeat: Shkodran forces march into Montenegro northwards in 1796 but are defeated at the Battle of Martinići, near modern-day Gornji Martinići, 3.5 km north of Spuž.; Lješkopolje is taken by the Albanians as forces under Bushati prepares to raid Cetinje.; Shkodran Albanians are intercepted and engage the Montenegrin at Battle of Krusi, suffering defeat. The leader of the Shkodran Albanians, Kara Mahmud Pasha, is killed.; Shkodran forces fall back to Podgorica, within Ottoman territory.
Ali Pasha's Invasion of Butrint (18–25 October 1798)	Pashalik of Yanina: Albanian irregular infantry and cavalry	First French Republic	Victory: Albanian Forces defeat French Forces.; On The 25 October général de brigade Nicolas Grégoire Aulmont de Verrières Ordered the destruction of fortifications and the evacuation of remaining French forces and Greek inhabitants of the town to Corfu.
Third Scutari-Ottoman War (1829–1831)	Pashalik of Scutari	Ottoman Empire	Defeat: Dissolution of the Pashalik of Scutari
Albanian revolts of 1833-1839	Albanian rebels	Ottoman Empire	Mixed Results, mostly in favour of Albania: Albanias are victorious in their Uprising in Shkodër in 1833.; The same year another uprising brakes out in Southern Albania, where the rebels are once again victorious.; Another Uprising brakes out during 1834-1835, in which ottomans are victorious in Southern Albania and Albanians are victorious in Northern Albania.; Two more Uprisings brake out in Southern Albania,one in 1836 and another in 1839.Ottomans suppress the uprising in 1836, however Albanians are victorious in the Uprising of 1839.
Uprising of Dervish Cara (1843–1844)	Albanian rebels	Ottoman Empire	Defeat: The uprising is suppressed by the Ottomans.; Dervish Cara is captured
Montenegrin Civil War of 1847	Brda Tribes: Serbian Piperi Tribe; Serbo-Albanian Kuči Tribe; Serbian Bjelopavlići Tribe; Crmnica Tribes	Prince-Bishopric of Montenegro	Defeat: Following a poor harvest and increased centralisation by the Montenegrin Prince, tribes in Brda and Crmnica rise up and attempt to secede from Montenegro.; The rebellion is quickly crushed and the ringleaders shot.
Battle of Lëkurës (1878)	Albanian irregulars	Greece	Victory: Greek forces capture Saranda.; Albanians defeat the Greeks in Gjashtë and again in Karalibej.; Greek forces retreat to the Lëkurës Castle which is besieged and retaken by Albanian troops, forcing Greeks to retreat.
Battle of Ulcinj (1880)	Ottoman Empire; Supported by Great Powers	Albanian irregulars League of Prizren	Ottoman victory: Ottoman forces crushed the League of Prizren resistance; Ulcinj was subsequently ceded to the Principality of Montenegro; Dissolution of the League of Prizren in 1881
League of Prizren Secessionist War (1880–1881)	League of Prizren	Ottoman Empire Support: The Great Powers; Principality of Montenegro	Defeat: League of Prizren captures areas of Kosovo and prevents Montenegrin annexation of Ulcinj.; Great Powers blockade Ulcinj and request the Ottomans "to pacify" the League.; Ottoman forces take Prizren, dismantle the League and deport the leaders of the League from Kosovo. They then invade Ulcinj and deliver it to Montenegro.
Albanian revolt of 1910	Albanian rebels	Ottoman Empire	Defeat: Rebellion suppressed
Malissori uprising (1911)	Albanian tribes	Ottoman Empire	Defeat: Rebellion suppressed
Albanian Revolt of 1912	Albanian rebels	Ottoman Empire	Victory: De-jure establishment of the Albanian Vilayet; Albanians Capture most of the Lands known today as Greater Albania

== Albanian Independence to the end of the First World War (1912–1918) ==
Conflict	Combatant 1	Combatant 2	Result
Battle of Lumë (November–6 December 1912)	Albanian Irregulars	Kingdom of Serbia	Defeat: Serbian military victory
Ohrid–Debar uprising (1913)	IMRO; Kachaks	Serbia; Greece	Serbo–Greek victory: Albanian and IMRO forces rise against Serbian rule in the Ohrid and Debar regions; The uprising temporarily captures Debar and surrounding areas; Serbian forces launch a counteroffensive and suppress the uprising
1914–1915 Muslim revolts in Albania	Principality of Albania (1914); Senate of Central Albania; Kingdom of Serbia	Muslim Rebels; Supported by: Ottoman Empire	Government victory: Pro-Ottoman Muslim peasants launch a series of revolts in central Albania, causing the collapse of the Principality.; The rebels subsequently besiege the new government of Essad Pasha Toptani in Durrës.; The Royal Serbian Army launches a massive military intervention in June 1915, decisively crushing the insurgency and executing the rebel leaders.
Italian invasion of Vlorë (December 1914)	Principality of Albania	Kingdom of Italy	Defeat: Italy occupies Sazan Island and Vlorë.
Austro-Hungarian invasion of Albania (January–April 1916)	Austria-Hungary; Albanian guerrillas	Kingdom of Italy; Republic of Central Albania; Kingdom of Serbia (Kingdom of Montenegro) Montenegro	Austro-Hungarian victory: Austro-Hungarian forces, aided by local Albanian guerrillas, successfully occupy northern and central Albania.; The pro-Entente Republic of Central Albania is dissolved, forcing Essad Pasha Toptani into permanent exile.; Defensive line is set up in the south of Albania along the Vjosa river..
Bulgarian invasion of Albania (December 1915)	Republic of Central Albania Kingdom of Italy; French Third Republic: Autonomous Albanian Republic of Korçë; Kingdom of Greece; Kingdom of Serbia (Kingdom of Montenegro) Montenegro	Kingdom of Bulgaria	Defeat: Bulgaria defeated all allied forces and fully occupied Albania for the remainder of the war

== Interwar Period (1918–1939) ==
Conflict	Combatant 1	Combatant 2	Result
Kachak Movement (1919–1927)	Kachaks; Committee for the National Defence of Kosovo	Kingdom of Yugoslavia; Principality of Albania (from 1922 onwards)	Yugoslav–Zogist victory
Koplik War (1920–1921)	Principality of Albania; Albanian Resistance	Kingdom of Serbs, Croats and Slovenes	Inconclusive
Vlora War (1920)	(Principality of Albania) Albanian Rebels	Kingdom of Italy: protectorate over Albania	Compromise agreement: Italy voluntarily abandons Vlora, but annexes the island of Saseno.; Italy abandons plans to establish a mandate over Albania, but retains diplomatic protection over the country to guarantee its special interests
Albanian-Yugoslav border war (1921)	Principality of Albania (Principality of Albania) Albanian guerillas led by Ahmet Zog	Kingdom of Serbs, Croats and Slovenes Kingdom of Greece; Republic of Mirdita (Russia) Army of Wrangel	Defeat: Yugoslav military victory; Restoration of the Status quo ante bellum; Conference of Ambassadors reaffirms 1913 borders; League of Nations commission intervention; Yugoslav withdrawal under international pressure; Suppression of the Republic of Mirdita
June Revolution (1924)	(Principality of Albania) Noli supporters: The Kachaks; Southern Albanian Çetas; Kelmendi Tribesmen	Principality of Albania: Mati Tribesmen; Tribesmen from Diber; (Russia) White Movement (Kingdom of Yugoslavia) Yugoslav Army	Noli victory: Fan Noli becomes the Prime Minister of Albania; Exile of Ahmet Zogu; 6 months later Zogu with Great Powers and Yugoslav support would coup the government
Zogist counter-revolution in Albania (1924) (1924)	(Principality of Albania) Noli Government	(Principality of Albania) Zogist rebels (Kingdom of Yugoslavia) Yugoslav Army (Russia) White Army; Support: Great Powers	Zogu Victory: Ahmet Zog coups the government of Fan Noli with the help of Yugoslav Army and Great Powers; Exile of Fan Noli
Italian invasion of Albania (1939)	Kingdom of Albania	Kingdom of Italy	Defeat: Italian occupation of Albania

== World War II and Cold War period (1939–1991) ==
Conflict	Combatant 1	Combatant 2	Result
Albanian Resistance of World War II (1939–1944)	(Albania) LANÇ; Legality Movement; Balli Kombëtar (Until 1943)	Kingdom of Italy (Until 1943): Italian Albania; Nazi Germany (From 1943): German Albania; Balli Kombëtar (From 1943); Second League of Prizren (From 1943)	Albanian Communist Victory: Liberation of Albania from Axis occupation.; Balli Kombëtar defeated.; Albania becomes a Communist state.
Uprising in Montenegro (1941)	Italy: Governing Committee of Montenegro; Montenegrin Greens; Independent State of Croatia; (Kingdom of Albania in personal union with Italy) Albania; Sandžak militia	Communist Party of Yugoslavia (Yugoslav Partisans) Partisans	Axis victory: The uprising begins in July 1941 against Italian occupation; Insurgents temporarily capture large areas of Montenegro; Italian and allied forces launch a counteroffensive; Albanian forces, including irregulars from Vermosh under Prek Cali, participate in the fighting; The uprising is suppressed by December 1941
Albanian Civil War (1943–1944)	LANÇ; Supported by: United Kingdom; Yugoslav Partisans	Balli Kombëtar (Albania) Legaliteti; Supported by: Germany	LANÇ Victory: Establishment of the Democratic Government of Albania.
The Kelmend uprising (1945)	People's Socialist Republic of Albania	Kelmendi tribesmen	PR Albania victory: The Uprising is suppressed.; Communist forces gain control of the Kelmendi region.
Anti-Communist Resistance in Mirditë (1945–1950)	People's Socialist Republic of Albania	Mirdita Tribesmen	PR Albania victory: The Uprising is suppressed.; Communist forces gain control of the Mirdita region.
Postribë uprising (1946)	Postribë anti-communist rebels	(Albania) Albanian government Sigurimi; Albanian People's Army	Albanian government victory: Anti-communist forces in the Postribë region rise against the communist government; The uprising is quickly suppressed by government forces; Numerous rebels are arrested and executed or imprisoned; The uprising fails to overthrow the communist government
Albanian–Yugoslav border conflict (1948–1954)	PR Albania	(Socialist Federal Republic of Yugoslavia) SFR Yugoslavia Financial/Military support: United States	Ceasefire: Pogradec Agreement; Cessation of border clashes; Restoration of border markers

== Post-Cold War period (1991–present) ==
Conflict	Combatant 1	Combatant 2	Result
War in Afghanistan (2001–2021)	Afghanistan; United States; United Kingdom; Canada; Netherlands; Germany; Italy; France; Denmark; Poland; Romania; Turkey; Australia; Spain; Albania; ISAF	(Afghanistan) Taliban al-Qaeda; Haqqani network Hezb-e-Islami Gulbuddin; United Tajik Opposition; IMU; Other groups	Defeat: Fall of Taliban régime in 2001; Osama bin Laden killed; Taliban retakes Kabul; Return of Taliban régime in 2021
Iraq War (2003–2011)	Iraq; Iraqi Kurdistan; MNF–I: United States; United Kingdom; Australia; Poland; Albania	SCJL; Naqshbandi Army ISI: al-Qaeda; FIA; Ansar al-Islam; IAI Mahdi Army; Special Groups; Badr Brigades; Kata'ib Hezbollah	Victory: Invasion and occupation of Iraq; Overthrow of Ba'ath Party government; Execution of Saddam Hussein; Emergence of significant insurgency, rise of al-Qaeda in Iraq; Civil war between 2006 and 2008; Subsequent reduction in violence and depletion of al-Qaeda in Iraq in 2008; Establishment of parliamentary democracy and formation of new Shia-led government; Macedonian and Albanian withdrawal in 2008; Withdrawal of US forces from Iraq in 2011

== See also ==
- List of conflicts involving Albanian rebel groups in the post–Cold War era
