= Epirus Revolt of 1878 =

Uprisings in Ottoman Greece

The 1878 revolt in Epirus was the part of a series of Greek uprisings that occurred in various parts of Ottoman-ruled Greece, as in Macedonia and Crete, during the outbreak of the Russo-Turkish War (1877-1878). Although Greek officials individually supported the revolt, the Greek Government, being aware of the international situation in eastern Europe at the time, decided not to do so. With the end of the Russo-Turkish War the revolt was soon suppressed.

== Background ==
On April 24, 1877, Russia declared war on Ottoman Empire and soon after a series of battles, the Ottoman defeat was imminent. Meanwhile, unofficial circles in Greece saw the war as a great opportunity to incite revolts in a number of Greek-inhabited regions in the Ottoman Empire: Epirus, Macedonia, Thessalia and Crete.

== Preparations ==
In 1877, two patriotic organizations were formed in Greece in order to organize an upcoming revolt in Epirus: National Defence (Greek: Εθνική Άμυνα) and Fraternity (Greek: Αδελφότητα). Soon after, the organizations started to create groups of volunteers and to collect weapons and ammunition. In December, distinguished Epirotes that lived in Athens, including General Michail Spyromilios and Dimitrios Botsaris (son of Notis Botsaris), were ready to lead the uprising, but the Greek Government being aware of that situation intervened and stopped their involvement.

== The uprising ==
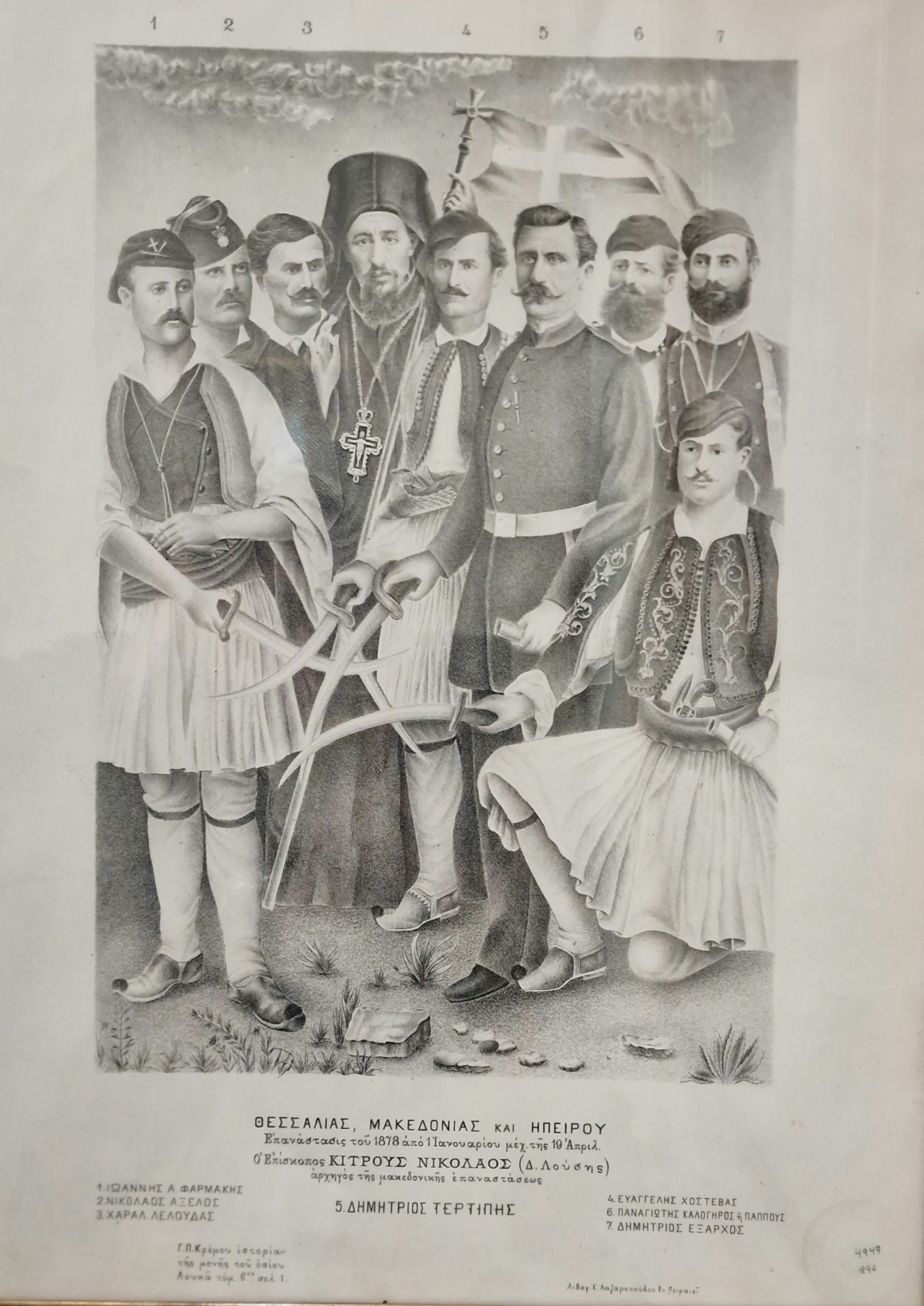
Greek revolutionaries during the 1878 revolt in Thessaly, Macedonia and Epirus

=== First conflicts and declaration of Union with Greece ===
In February 1878 groups of irregulars passed the Greek-Ottoman border and entered Thessaly and Epirus. The first regions that joined the revolt were Tzoumerka, west of Arta, the region north of Preveza and Radovizio (north Thesprotia). The uprising was however, ill-prepared and the weaknesses were obvious already from the first days. When the first conflicts with Ottoman troops occurred, most of the revolutionaries retreated to Greece. At Plaka, an Ottoman outpost was overcome by an Epirot unit led by a resigned officer of the Greek Army, Hristos Mitsios. However, upon the arrival of 2,000 Ottoman troops from Ioannina, they had to retreat.

Meanwhile, the Russo-Turkish War ended with the Treaty of San Stefano (March 3, 1878). The sudden end of the Russo-Turkish hostilities had a negative impact on the revolt's outcome. At March 12, representatives of the movement gathered in the village of Botsi (Thesprotia), and declared the Union of Epirus with Greece. Soon after, a significant number of Ottoman troops arrived with troopships in the region and took under control the entire region. The revolutionaries seeing that resistance was futile, retreated behind to the Greek border.

=== Lappas and Stephanou revolt ===
Meanwhile, before the revolt in Radovizi was suppressed, a group of 150 armed Epirotes landed in the Saranda region, under the leadership of the guerrilla captains Minoas Lappas and Georgios Stephanou. Soon a greater number of volunteers (700), mainly Epirote refugees from Corfu joined the uprising. Apart from the town of Saranda, they had under control the surrounding regions of Vurgut and Delvina: including the villages of Gjashtë and Lëkurës, as well as the nearby monastery of St. George.

The Ottoman military commander of Yannina with a force of 6,000 regular troops marched against Saranda. The Ottomans were also supported by irregular bands of Albanians. At March 4, after fierce fighting the revolt ended.

== Reprisals ==
When the revolt in Saranda was finally suppressed, reprisals started. As a result, 20 villages of the region of Delvina were burned while escape routes for the unarmed population were blocked.

Because many distinguished locals (like Kyriakos Kyritsis, later MP in the Greek Parliament) financially supported the revolt, the Ottoman authorities had all their holdings in the Saranda-Butrint region confiscated.

== Aftermath ==
The failure of the 1878 movement in Epirus was mainly due to the unwillingness of the Greek Government to support this initiative actively. On the other hand, the Russo-Turkish War ended too soon, so that the Ottoman troops could quickly move and suppress any form of disturbance.

== See also ==
- Cretan revolt (1878)
- 1878 Greek Macedonian rebellion
- Epirus Revolt of 1854
- Cretan Revolt (1866–1869)

== Sources ==
- W. A. Heurtley; H. C. Darby; C. M. Woodhouse (1967). A Short history of Greece from early times to 1964. CUP Archive. ISBN 978-0-521-09454-2.
- Zelepos, Ioannis (2002). Die Ethnisierung griechischer Identität, 1870-1912 (in German). Oldenbourg Wissenschaftsverlag. ISBN 978-3-486-56666-6.
- Jeremy, Black (2009). War in the Nineteenth Century, 1800-1914. Polity. ISBN 978-0-7456-4448-6.
- Sakellariou, M. V. (1997). Epirus, 4000 years of Greek history and civilization. Ekdotike Athenon. ISBN 978-960-213-371-2.
- Ruches, P.J. (1967). Albanian Historical Folksongs. Argonaut.
- Ruches, Pyrrhus J. (1965). Albania's captives. Chicago: Argonaut.
