= Koplik uprising =

1945 Albanian anti-communist armed uprising

- Part of the anti-communist insurgencies in Central and Eastern Europe
| Date | January 23, 1945 |
| Location | Albania, Koplik |
| Result | Communist victory: Suppression of the rebellion in Koplik; Government Power is Established in Koplik |

Belligerents
| Albania | Anti-Communist rebels |

Commanders and leaders
| Zoi Themeli | Lesh Marashi (executed) |

Units involved
| Sigurimi LANÇ | Anti-Communist Rebels |

Strength
| Unknown | Unknown |

Casualties and losses
| 40 killed 50 wounded | 45 killed 25 wounded |

The Koplik Uprising (Albanian: Kryengritja e Koplikut) was an anti-communist armed revolt in Albania that took place on January 23, 1945. In Koplik, the center of Malësia e Madhe. It was one of the earliest uprisings against the ruling Communist Party in Eastern Europe. The uprising occurred under national-democratic ideas and was eventually suppressed by state security forces.

== Context ==
In November 1944, before the end of World War II, the Communist Party of Albania, led by Enver Hoxha, came to power. The government adopted a strictly pro-Soviet Stalinist policy: it established a monopoly on political power, nationalized the economy, dismantled traditional social structures, and promoted the cult of Hoxha. Emissaries of the Communist Party of Yugoslavia, Albania's closest ally at the time, played a prominent role in shaping the regime.

The new authorities launched a campaign of political repression. The state security forces and special Pursuit Brigades carried out extrajudicial killings. The most intense terror occurred in the mountainous regions of northern Albania. Resistance came from the republican nationalists of Balli Kombëtar, the royalists of the Legality movement, and local clan-tribal communities. The center of resistance emerged in the northern region of Shkodër.

In the Shkodër district of Malësia e Madhe, the rebel formation was commanded by Major Lesh Marashi of the Royal Albanian Army, a nationalist anti-communist and former member of the anti-fascist movement. He aimed to coordinate his actions with Balli Kombëtar fighters under the command of Abas Ermenji, the Kelmendi tribal militia led by Prek Cali, the armed underground of the Markagjoni clan in Mirdita, and the Postribë rebel center led by Jup Kazazi.

The main bases of Marashi's movement were the Kastrati and Shkreli communities, known for their traditionalism, national-patriotic sentiment, and strong influence from the Catholic Church.

== Program ==
The movement's ideology was broadly national-democratic. Its political program was rooted in meetings of nationalist leaders held during 1943–1944. Traditional clan authorities and Catholic priests from Shkodër developed a plan to “prevent the communists from entering the north” following the withdrawal of Italian and German occupiers. The geographic isolation and rugged terrain of Malësia e Madhe were seen as advantageous for resistance.

Plans were made to establish local armed forces and create administrative structures. The movement also hoped for British support to counterbalance the Soviet and Yugoslav backing of the CPA. Propaganda emphasized the similarities between fascism, Nazism, and communism, portraying them all as forms of dictatorship.

== Uprising ==
On January 10, 1945, Lesh Marashi's rebels entered the large village of Kastrati, where they received enthusiastic support from locals. Twenty captured communists were released. On January 13, a strategic conference was held in the village of Beltojë, attended by anti-communist commanders, political leaders, and representatives of the Catholic Church. Lesh Marashi and Prek Cali, allies in a military coalition, were especially committed to the cause.

Initial tactical successes included the capture of several villages, temporary roadblocks, and disruption of telephone communication with Tirana and Shkodër. Lifted by these gains, the rebels planned an attack on the town of Koplik, the administrative center of Malësia e Madhe. They even envisioned capturing the port of Shëngjin to establish contact with Western Europe. The defeat of the Kelmendi uprising on January 15 and the arrest of Prek Cali did not discourage them; instead, it accelerated their plans.

The military assault was launched on January 23, 1945. Marashi's detachment attacked the barracks of the communist National Liberation Front in Koplik. At first, the element of surprise gave the rebels an advantage. However, they were vastly outnumbered and outgunned by the government forces.

Large reinforcements from the National Liberation Front and Sigurimi, led by Major Zoi Themeli, arrived from Shkodër. The battle lasted for about a day. The government forces received support from Yugoslav units. The rebels suffered 45 dead and 25 wounded, forcing them to retreat. Government losses were reported as 40 killed and 50 wounded.

In the following weeks, the security services launched a widespread purge of Malësia e Madhe. Suspected rebels were executed, and the property of local peasants was confiscated. The search for Lesh Marashi continued relentlessly. Operational reports were sent directly to Mehmet Shehu.

Lesh Marashi remained in hiding in the mountains for about a year and a half. In 1946, he was captured after a shootout with state security forces. At a show trial in Shkodër, he was sentenced to death and publicly hanged.

== Legacy ==
The Koplik uprising is historically recognized as one of the few earliest armed uprisings against a communist regime in Eastern Europe. Although it occurred during the final phase of World War II, it was an independent Albanian anti-communist insurrection.

In modern Albania, anti-communist groups view the Koplik Uprising as a democratic and national liberation movement. Their opponents view it quite differently. Some studies particularly highlight the influential role of the Catholic Church in the uprising.
