= Postribë uprising =

1946 Albanian anti-communist armed uprising

- Part of the anti-communist insurgencies in Central and Eastern Europe
Date	September 9, 1946
Location	Albania, Postribë
Result	Communist Victory: Suppression of the rebellion in Postribë and in Shkodër area; Government Power is Established in the majority of Shkodër and Postribë

Belligerents
People's Socialist Republic of Albania	Postribë rebels

Commanders and leaders
Koçi Xoxe; Zoi Themelii; Musa Daci	Jup Kazazi ‡‡ Osman Haxhia (executed)

Units involved
Sigurimi	Anti-Communist Rebels

Strength
Unknown	150-200 Rebels

Casualties and losses
Unknown	65 Killed; 19 Captured

The Postribë Uprising (Albanian: Kryengritja e Postribës), also known as the Postrib Movement (Albanian: Lëvizja e Postribës), was an anti-communist armed uprising in Albania on September 9, 1946. The name comes from the Postrib community in Shkodër County. The movement operated under national democratic slogans against the dictatorship of the Communist Party of Albania. Balli Kombëtar, royalists, traditional clan authorities, and their supporters participated in the uprising. However, it was suppressed by government forces of the Sigurimi. It was among the earliest attempts to challenge communist rule in Eastern Europe after World War II.

== Context ==
In November 1944, before the end of World War II, the Communist Party of Albania, led by Enver Hoxha, seized power in Albania. The government adopted a strictly pro-Soviet Stalinist policy. The National Liberation Army established a one-party monopoly, nationalized the economy, dismantled traditional social structures, and enforced the cult of Hoxha. Emissaries from the Communist Party of Yugoslavia, Albania’s closest ally at the time, played a key role in consolidating power.

Massive Sigurimi repression targeted political opponents and so-called "hostile classes." In 1945, a special court issued numerous death sentences, while Special Pursuit Brigades carried out extrajudicial executions. The most brutal terror campaigns took place in northern Albania’s mountainous regions under the leadership of Mehmet Shehu.

Resistance to the new regime came from various groups, including the republican nationalists of Balli Kombëtar, the royalists of the Legaliteti movement, and traditional clan-based communities. Armed resistance was particularly active in northern Albania. As early as January 1945, Balli Kombëtar rebels, led by nationalist activist Abas Ermenji, attempted to seize Shkodër and establish a rebel government in the North. Around the same time, the Koplik Uprising erupted in Malësi e Madhe under the leadership of former royal army officer Lesh Marashi. Meanwhile, large government forces were deployed to suppress the Kelmendi Uprising in the Accursed Mountains, led by Prek Cali. In Mirdita, the Markagjoni clan’s Committee of the Mountains also actively resisted the communist regime.

By early 1946, open resistance had been suppressed by the authorities. Abas Ermenji emigrated, while Lesh Marashi and Prek Cali were captured and executed. However, the anti-communist underground in Albania persisted.

Its social base consisted primarily of traditional communities and clans, particularly in the mountainous regions of northern Albania, especially around Shkodër. The movement was organized by Balli Kombëtar members, supporters of Ahmet Zogu (as republican nationalists and royalists united under anti-communism), former members of the Albanian Fascist Party, and influential clan leaders. They were supported by segments of the peasantry, as well as the middle and lower urban classes.

== Resistance in Postribë ==
One of the key centers of anti-communist resistance formed in the Postribë community—an area consisting of about ten villages near Shkodër. Known for its strong national-patriotic and rebellious traditions, Postribë militias had previously taken part in the battles for Shkodër in 1913, the Vlora War in 1920.

== Organization ==
The Postribë movement was led by traditional clan authority Osman Haxhia and economist Jup Kazazi. During the Italian occupation, Kazazi had served as the general secretary of the fascist party before breaking ties with the Italians, contacting the British military mission, and joining the armed resistance. He later became a member of Balli Kombëtar and played an active role in the 1945 uprisings alongside Abas Ermenji and Lesh Marashi.

Political connections with the movement were maintained by well-known democratic politicians such as lawyer Riza Dani, a Republican and supporter of Fan Noli, who was considered the ideological force behind the uprising, though he did not directly participate. Another key figure was journalist Myzafer Pipa, who spread anti-communist propaganda among the Shkodër intelligentsia. Other movement leaders—including Paulin Pali, Abas Sulejmani, Pjeter Pali, Gjelosh Vata, Mustafa Yakupi Pjeter Luli, Kasem Rragibi—mainly came from local village authorities.

These leaders had diverse political backgrounds but were united by their strong opposition to the communist regime. They commanded respect among peasants, small traders, artisans, and the marginalized classes of Northern Albania. The total number of Postrib rebels was estimated at 150-200 fighters, mostly nationalist peasants of Muslim or Catholic faith.

== Goals ==
The Postribë movement was driven by anti-communism, nationalist sentiment, and traditional tribal values. It strongly opposed Yugoslavia, viewing Enver Hoxha’s regime as "Serbian-communist". The uprising was a direct response to the brutal communist repression carried out by Mehmet Shehu.

== The Uprising ==
The attack plan was developed in July 1946, when Osman Haxhia convened a meeting of commanders from various anti-communist groups. The plan aimed to seize control of Shkodër, including military barracks, a weapons depot, a prison housing political prisoners, and the Ministry of Internal Affairs administration. The rebels hoped to gain mass public support and anticipated assistance from Britain, which they believed would counterbalance Yugoslav and Soviet support for the communist government.

"We have knives! It's not difficult! There is no other way—they have touched our honor and religion!" — Osman Haxhia

On September 7, 1946, a final operational meeting took place under Haxhia's leadership. The uprising was moved up to September 9 due to intelligence leaks and an increasing concentration of government troops being transferred from Gjirokastër to Shkodër.

== The Battle ==
On the night of September 9, 1946, three rebel columns set out from different villages toward Shkodër. The main force of 70–80 fighters was led by Osman Haxhia, while two smaller units of 25–40 fighters each were commanded by Pjeter Pali, Gjelosh Vata, Mustafa Yakupi, and Pjeter Luli.

The rebels managed to breach the city limits and temporarily blocked the strategic Lezhë–Shkodër highway. The fighting occurred near Shkodër prison, where government troops, under the command of Musa Daci, used heavy weaponry and artillery to repel the attack. Several rebel commanders were killed. The overwhelming superiority of government forces in organization, numbers, and firepower soon became evident, and the rebels failed to reach their intended targets.

News of the uprising reached Enver Hoxha, who issued direct orders to Minister of Internal Affairs Koçi Xoxe to restore order immediately. Major Zoi Themeli, an experienced Sigurimi officer, was dispatched from Tirana to lead security operations in northern Albania.

Under Temel’s command, government forces launched a powerful counteroffensive, drove the rebels out of Shkodër, and conducted extensive raids across Postribë. Clashes continued for several days, with the Sigurimi conducting a particularly intense manhunt for Jup Kazazi.

== Aftermath ==
During the battle on September 9, 65 rebels were killed. Between 12 and 19 captured fighters were executed without trial. In retaliation, security forces burned 30 homes in Postribë and arrested numerous individuals, including women, subjecting them to brutal torture.

Sigurimi reports labeled the rebels as "fascists, kulaks, traders, and former officers of Zog", though, in reality, the group included individuals from diverse backgrounds—including former members of the anti-fascist and anti-Nazi resistance. Most of the fighters were ordinary peasants.

== Trials and Executions ==
The trial of the Postribe Uprising participants took place in Shkodër from May 1947 to January 1948. On September 17, 1946, Sigurimi agents located Jup Kazazi, who took his own life to avoid capture. His four brothers were sentenced to death. A widely circulated photograph of Kazazi’s corpse surrounded by government soldiers served as a warning to future dissidents. Several other key figures also met tragic fates:

- Nine people, including Osman Haxia and Catholic Priest Gjergj Volaj, were sentenced to death.
- Four were sentenced to life imprisonment.
- Five received prison terms of 15 to 20 years.
- Riza Dani was purged in the Parliamentary Group Trials.
- Zoi Themelii was promoted to head of the Shkodër Interior Ministry and later became a Sigurimi general. However, in 1966, he was purged due to his past ties with Koçi. Xoxe, who had been executed years earlier.
- Myzafer Pipa died under torture.

== Legacy ==
The Postrib Uprising can be seen as one of the few earliest anti-communist revolts in post-war Eastern Europe. Its memory holds significant importance for Albanian anti-communists. Leading historians, including Uran Butka, have worked to reconstruct the events.

Anniversaries of the uprising are regularly commemorated, sometimes with government participation. The Democratic Party of Albania honors the rebels as heroes of the anti-communist resistance.

In September 2018, events marking the uprising’s anniversary were held, with DP leader Lulzim Basha calling the rebellion and Prek Cali’s resistance movement "a priceless war for freedom".
