= Battle of Lëkurës =

Conflict in Southern Albania

Coordinates: 42°46′N 20°49′E

- Part of The Albanian National Awakening and Russo-Turkish War of 1877–1878
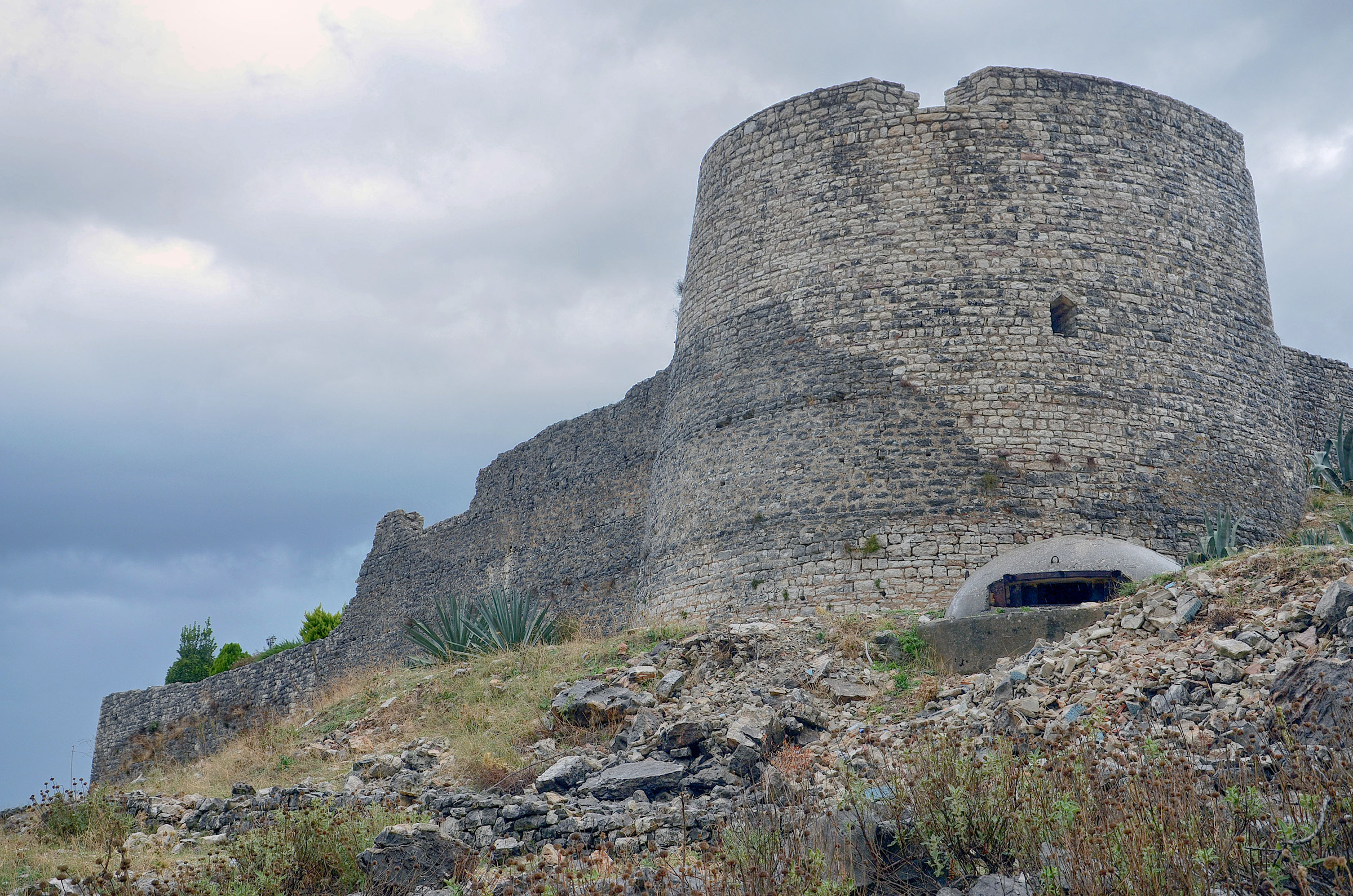
- The walls of Lëkurësi Castle
Date	28 February – 4 March 1878
Location	Lëkurës, Saranda, Ottoman Albania (present-day Albania)
Result	Albanian victory

Belligerents
Albanian irregulars Greek claim: Vilayet of Yanina	Greece

Commanders and leaders
Idriz Alidima; Myslym Gjoleka; Abedin Dina	Georgios Stephanou; Lappas Stephanou

Strength
Hundreds; Greek claim: 6,000 troops	850 troops

Casualties and losses
Unknown	590 killed or captured

The Battle of Lëkurës, also known as the Lëkurës War, was an armed engagement in Lëkurës (present-day Albania) in 1878, between Greek forces and Albanian irregulars.

== Background ==
During the 19th century the Albanian Vilayets were in bad relations with the Ottomans who had ignored previous requests for national Albanian rights. This led to extreme poverty, corruption in the governments and Albanian education being illegal in the Albanian Vilayets. Due to these problems some Albanians believed that the only way to stop Ottoman ignorance and cruelty was an armed revolt. Prênk Bibë Doda would lead a revolt during 1877 in the region of Mirdita with the goal of creating an autonomous republic however the revolt would get suppressed.

In the same year Tosk Albanians started to plan their own revolt against the Ottomans. Albanian lord Abdyl Frashëri attempted to organize an alliance between Albanians and Greece. During July 1877 he set on a series of peace talks with Greek politician Epominonda Mavromatis. However, the Greeks were not interested in an alliance showing more interest in making the Albanian vilayets their puppet states.

== Conflict ==
On 28 February 1878, 150 Greek soldiers commanded by the Stefani brothers landed on the village of Lëkurës and were joined by another 700 volunteers. After landing they entered and captured the city of Saranda with no resistance. Upon hearing about the Greek invasion, local Albanian lords gathered a number of irregulars and started to make their way to face the Greek forces.

The Albanian forces included men from the regions of Himara, Gjirokastër, and Vlora. Upon the arrival of Albanian forces, the Greeks split themselves in 2 parts, one marching to the village of Gjashtë and the other marching to the village of Qufa.The first Greek army led by Giorgos Stefanis was attacked by the first Albanian forces led by Idriz Alidhima in February 1878 in the Hills around Gjashtë. The fighting was fierce with casualties on both sides. On the other hand, the second army could only reach the village of Karalibej before being attacked by the forces of Myslym Gjoleka and Abidin Dino.

According to Greek sources, the greek rebels engaged with the forces of the Vilayet of Yanina which totaled to 6000 men, instead of local irregulars.

After a fierce firefight the Greeks took heavy casualties and retreated from Karalibej. Greek forces also retreated from Gjashtë after being defeated by Albanian forces. Both Greek armies reunited and positioned themselves in the castle of Lëkurës which the Albanian forces would siege. Greek forces were initially planning an escape from the sea, however that plan fell apart when an Ottoman Warship started patrolling the waters around the Corfu Channel.

On 28 February 1878 the Albanians lead one last attack, breaking the defense of the Lëkurës Castle and inflicting heavy casualties on the Greek forces, which retreated to the coast of Lëkurës and sailed away. Later at the start of March a peace treaty was made between the Greeks and Albanians ending the conflict with Greek forces failing to capture South Albania.

In the end 590 Greek forces were killed and captured.

== See also ==
- Battles for Plav and Gusinje
- Battle of Novšiće
- Velika attacks (1879)
- Battle of Ržanica
- Battle of Murino
- Battle of Agri Pass

== Sources ==
- Gawrych, George (2006). The Crescent and the Eagle: Ottoman rule, Islam and the Albanians, 1874–1913. London: IB Tauris. ISBN 9781845112875.
- Xhaferr, Belegu (1938). Lidhja e Prizrenit dhe veprimet e saj: 1878-1881. Vatra. ISBN 9989665869.
- Sakellariou, M. V. (1997). Epirus, 4000 years of Greek history and civilization. Ekdotike Athenon. ISBN 978-960-213-371-2.
