= Hamza (name) =

- Pronunciation: Arabic: [ˈħæmzæ, ˈħamza, ˈħamze, ˈħɛmzæ, ˈʜæmzɐ, ˈʜɑmzɐ] Urdu: [ˈhəmzə] Persian: [hæmˈze]
- Gender: Male
- Language: Arabic

Origin
- Language: Arabic
- Meaning: lion, strong, steadfast

Other names
- Variant forms: Humza, Hamzah, Hamzeh, Hamsah, Khamzat, Hamëz

Hamza (Arabic: حَمْزَة, romanized: Ḥamza, also spelled as Hamzah, Hamsah, Hamzeh, Humza, Khamzat or Hamëz) is an Arabic masculine given name in the Muslim world. Meaning strong, and steadfast, it is an Arabic epithet for lion. It was borne by one of the Islamic prophet Muhammad's uncles, Hamza ibn Abd al-Muttalib, a wrestler and an archer who was renowned for his strength and bravery in battle. His exploits were detailed in the Hamzanama, an adventure epic written in Persian.

== Given name ==
- Hamza (rapper), full name Hamza Al-Farissi, Belgian rapper of Moroccan descent
- Hamza Ali Abbasi, Pakistani actor, model, and film director
- Hamza Abdallah (born 2003), Comorian footballer
- Hamza Abdel Mawla (1923–1987), Egyptian footballer
- Hamza Aboud (born 1984), Lebanese footballer
- Hamza Abourazzouk (born 1986), Moroccan footballer
- Hamza Abdullah, American football safety
- Hamza Abdullahi (1945–2019), Nigerian Air Force air marshal and governor
- Hamza Abu-Ghalia (born 1980), Libyan weightlifter
- Hamza Akman (born 2004) is a Turkish professional footballer
- Hamza al-Ghamdi (1980–2001), Saudi hijacker of United Airlines Flight 175
- Hamza al-Khateeb (1997–2011), Syrian child tortured to death by Syrian government
- Hamza Alvi (1921–2003), Pakistani Marxist academic sociologist and activist
- Humza Arshad, British-Pakistani actor, writer, comedian and YouTube personality
- Hamza Abdi Barre (born 1972), prime minister of Somalia
- Hamza Bencherif, footballer
- Hamza Bogary (1932–1984), Arabic author from Mecca
- Hamza Boulemdaïs (born 1982), Algerian football player
- Hamza Çakir (born 1985), German footballer of Turkish descent
- Hamza Çalışkan (born 1994), Turkish Paralympian para table tennis player
- Hamza Čataković (born 1997), Bosnian professional footballer
- Hamza Chatholi (born 1981), Indian athlete
- Khamzat Chimaev, Chechen mixed martial artist
- Hamza Choudhury (born 1997), professional footballer
- Hamza Dair (born 2002), Moroccan sprinter
- Hamza Demir (born 1956), Swedish politician
- Hamza El Din, Oud player, composer and ethnomusicologist
- Hamza Dirani, Jordanian racing driver
- Hamzah Fansuri, Sufi poet from Sumatra
- Hamza Feghouli (1938–2025), Algerian actor
- Hamza Güreler (born 2006), Turkish footballer
- Hamza Hamzaoğlu, former Turkish footballer and football manager
- Hamzah Haz (1940–2024), former vice-president of Indonesia
- Hamza Humo (1895–1970), Bosnian journalist, poet, dramatist, and writer
- Hamza Jashari, Albanian guerrilla fighter.
- Prince Hamzah of Jordan, son of the late King Hussein of Jordan
- Hamza Kashgari, Saudi columnist
- Hamza Kastrioti, Ottoman military personnel
- Hamza Kattan (born 1997), Jordan taekwondo practitioner
- Hamza al-Kateab, Syrian doctor, activist, and public health advocate
- Hamza Kheir (born 1993), Lebanese footballer
- Hamza Koudri, Algerian footballer
- Hamza Ménina (born 1981), retired Algerian triple jumper
- Hamza Mirza (1568–1586), Safavid crown prince of Iran
- Hamza ibn ‘Abd al-Muttalib, noted Sahābi and uncle of Muhammad
- Hamza Namira, Egyptian singer-songwriter, and multi-instrumentalist
- Hamza Hakimzade Niyazi, Uzbek poet
- Hamza Pasha, multiple people
- Hamza Rhattas (born 1994), Moroccan footballer
- Hamza Ruhezamihigo, Rwandan basketball player
- Hamza Sakhi, Moroccan football player
- Hamza Shah Saifuddin, fourth Sultan of Bengal
- Hamzah Sheeraz (born 1999), British boxer
- Hamzah Shehatta, Saudi poet
- Hamza Tzortzis (born 1980), British Muslim apologist, public speaker and a researcher on Islam
- Hamza Uddin (born 2003), English professional boxer
- Hamza Walker (born 1966), American art curator
- Hamza Yassin, Sudanese-born British TV presenter
- Hamza Yerlikaya, Turkish Graeco-Roman style wrestler
- Hamza Younés, Tunisian footballer
- Humza Yousaf, British politician
- Hamza Yusuf (born 1958), American Islamic scholar, neo-traditionalist, and co-founder of Zaytuna College
- Hamzah Zainudin, Malaysian politician
- Hamza Zakari (footballer) (born 1994), Ghanaian professional football midfielder

== Surname ==
- Amiruddin Hamzah, Malaysian politician
- Bur’i Mohamed Hamza, Somali politician
- Fuad Hamza, Saudi Arabian government official
- Gamal Hamza, Egyptian footballer
- Khidir Hamza, nuclear technician who worked with Saddam Hussein
- Mauro Hamza (born 1965 or 1966), Egyptian fencing coach
- Mir Hamza (born 1992), a Pakistani cricketer
- Muhammad Hamza (1929–2021), Pakistani politician
- Obaidullah Hamzah (born 1972), Bangladeshi Islamic scholar
- Tengku Amir Hamzah, Indonesian poet
- Tengku Razaleigh Hamzah, Malaysian politician
- Zubayr Hamza (born 1995), a South African cricketer
- Abdul Nasir bin Amer Hamsah, Singaporean criminal and prisoner

== Derived names ==
- Abu Hamza
