= Committee of the Mountains =

Albanian anti-communist organization

- Komiteti i Maleve
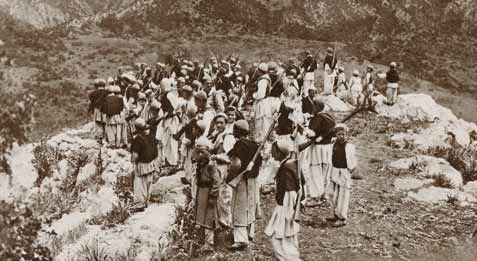
- Armed albanians from Mirdita (1907)
- Leaders: Gjon Markagjoni; Ndue Markagjoni; Mark Markagjoni; Sander "Llesh" Markagjoni; Ndue Pjeter Gjomarkaj; Ndue Gjon Melyshi
- Dates active: 1945–1950
- Dissolved: 1950
- Active regions: Mirdita
- Ideology: Albanian nationalism Anti-communism; Traditionalism; Catholic social teaching

Anti-Communist Resistance in Mirditë
- Part of the Cold War, Anti-communist insurgencies in Central and Eastern Europe
Date	1945–1950
Location	Albania, Mirdita
Result	Communist victory: Dissolution of The Committee of The Mountains; Government Power is Established over Mirdita

Belligerents
People's Socialist Republic of Albania	Committee of the Mountains: Albanian Anti-Communists

Commanders and leaders
Enver Hoxha; Mehmet Shehu; Beqir Ndou; Bardhok Biba X Pal Mëlyshi †	Gjon Markagjoni (Political Leader); Ndue Markagjoni (executed); Mark Markagjonii †; Sander "Llesh" Markagjoni †; Ndue Gjon Melyshi

Units involved
Sigurimi	Free Albania National Committee

Strength
Unknown	12,000 Albanian Anti-Communists (Mostly Landowners, Merchants and Catholics)

Casualties and losses
Unknown	300 Sent to Labour Camps, Prison or deported 14 Executed
- 3 Teachers Killed by Anti-Communists

The Committee of the Mountains (Albanian: Komiteti i Maleve), also the National Committee of the Mountains (Albanian: Komiteti Kombëtar i Maleve) was an Albanian anti-communist underground organization active in the northern Mirdita region in the second half of the 1940s. Created on the basis of the Mirdita clan of Markagjoni. It advocated for Albanian nationalism, traditional values and right-wing ideologies. The Committee led an armed struggle against the ruling Communist Party of Albania, and committed a number of attacks, assaults against the Communist state.

== Mirdita and Markagjoni ==
Mirdita is a region in northern Albania. The region is notable for having the highest number of Catholics in Albania, having maintained resistance against Ottoman rule from the 15th century until Albania gained independence. The name comes from the mountain tribe of the same name. The social order for centuries was based on traditional clan organization and customary law. Confessionally, Mirditor Albanians are predominantly Catholic.

Politically and culturally, Mirdita was dominated by powerful families around which armed militias were organized. Mirdita maintained a certain independence from the Ottoman authorities, and after 1912 from the central government in Tirana.

The most influential clan had long been the Markagjoni family, who held the traditional title Kapidani. In 1921, the head of the Kapidan clan, Marka Gjoni, raised a separatist uprising against the Albanian principality and proclaimed the Republic of Mirdita. This action was quickly suppressed, but Ahmet Zogu guaranteed the traditional autonomy of Mirdita and the rights of the Catholic populations in Albania.

After the death of Marka Gjoni in 1925, his son Gjon Markagjoni became the head of the clan. In his ideology, the principles of Albanian nationalism and Catholicism were combined with mountain clan traditions and a certain pro-Western orientation towards fascist Italy. Markagjoni was in contact with the government of Benito Mussolini, and was personally received by Pope Pius XII. The Markagjoni clan maintained a partnership with the King of Albania, Ahmet Zogu.

Gjon Markagjoni was also an active anti-communist. During the period of the Italian occupation, he was in the leadership of the Albanian Fascist Party, then created the Independent National Bloc (INB).

== Northern anti-communist resistance ==
November 1944, the Communist Party would ultimately come to power in Albania, led by Enver Hoxha. In the north of Albania, the new regime, oriented towards the Stalinist USSR, met stiff resistance. This was due to the fact that almost all the leading leaders of the Communist Party: Enver Hoxha, Mehmet Shehu, Hysni Kapo, Beqir Balluku, Spiro Koleka, Bedri Spahiu, Gogo Nushi, Manush Myftiu, Liri Belishova all had come from the south or, less commonly, from center of the country (with some of the exceptions being Haxhi Lleshi and Tuk Jakova). The Communist Party was seen very antagonistic to the Catholics, Eastern Orthodoxy, and Islam.

"Landowning families, merchants and Catholics. Moreover, the position of the first two categories were determined by economic interests, while representatives of the third are hostile to communism for religious reasons.”

— Brigadier Edward Hodgson, May 1945

Already in January 1945, the armed units of Abas Ermenji, under his command had tried to capture Shkodër. The Kelmend uprising led by Prek Cali broke out in the Accursed Mountains in Malësi e Madhe, Lesh Marashi launched a rebellion in Koplik. In September 1946, the Postribe uprising broke out under the leadership of Osman Haxhia and Jup Kazazi. In Mirdita, the anti-Communist movement was led by the Markagjoni clan.

Gjon Markagjoni and his son Ndue Markagjoni emigrated to Italy, where they subsequently established connections with the CIA. They exercised political leadership. Gjon entrusted operational command in Albania to two other sons - Mark Markagjoni and Sander "Llesh" Markagjoni. Both of whom were executed.

== Underground Committee ==
=== Personnel and principles ===
The structure of the underground anti-communist resistance of Mirdita became the Mountain Committee It was established in March 1945 under the leadership of Mark Markagjonii. It had included followers of the old Albanian traditions, Anti-Communists, Albanian Nationalists, former Albanian army officers, and Catholic priests.

The program of the Mountain Committee proclaimed that it was a struggle against communism - advocating for the freedom and national traditions of Albania. A special clause prohibited committee members from mutual blood feud and any kind of friction between each other. The killings of communists were declared as legitimate retribution for executions being done by the Communist Party and Sigurimi. The Committees struggle was characterized as national - for the rights of all Albanians, without distinction between regions and religions. In the future, the goal was to attack Tirana, overthrow the power of the communists and to hold free elections.

According to the organization itself, it consisted of about 500 people. The Committees operational connections and cells existed not only in the north in Shkodra, but also in Elbasan, Durrës, and Tirana. The committee claimed to have had at least 12 thousand members as its peak.

=== Raids against the Communist state ===
Activists of the Mountain Committee conducted anti-communist and anti-government raids, militants attacked representatives of the communist party administration and activists of the PPSH, They committed sabotage, arson, and murder pro communist Albanians. On April 25, 1948, the village teachers, sisters Tarazhi - Marta and Prenda - were killed for “serving the communists”.

After the death of Mark Markagjoni in a shootout with Sigurimi on June 14, 1946, in Seven in the Morning, the Mountain Committee was headed by Sander "Llesh" Markagjoni. He died under the same circumstances on August 9, 1947. He was replaced by Gjon the elder's cousin Ndue Pjeter Gjomarkaj, who was considered to be aggressive and merciless.

On February 9, 1949, an appeal signed by Kapidani was sent from Italy to Mirdita. Gjon and Ndue ordered the formation of a government body - the Mirdita Executive Committee, the establishment of connections with other anti-communist groups in the north of Albania, and the creation of a single Central Committee and Information Center. It was specifically ordered to extend resistance to Dibra and Kosovo. The credentials of Ndue Pjeter Gjomarkaj as the leader of the movement in Albania and Ndue Gjon Melyshi as his deputy were confirmed. The appeal ended with the triune principle of the Mountain Committee: Faith, Honor, Kinship.

=== Murder of Bardhok Biba ===
On July 1, 1949, a secret meeting was held and a decision was made to intensify the communists in the region. On August 7, 1949, underground members of the Mountain Committee, led by Ndue Bajraktari, shot and killed the secretary of the Mirdite Communist Party branch, Bardhok Biba. A note was left at the scene of the murder: “In the name of the Mountain Committee!” According to some reports, the perpetrators managed to escape across the border into Yugoslavia .

The special drama of the situation lay in the fact that Biba himself belonged to the Markagjoni clan, and in his childhood and youth he was favored by Gjon Sr. The Mountain Committee considered Biba a traitor and treated him with special hatred.

The murder of Biba gave the authorities the pretext for a massive campaign of repression in Mirdita. The orders for arrests and executions were given personally by Enver Hoxha. They were led on the spot by Interior Minister Mehmet Shehu, director Sigurimi Beqir Ndou, Chairman of the Military Court Bilbil Klosi, State Security Colonel Ziya Kambo, Lieutenant Togher Baba (aka Hodo Habibi). About 300 people were arrested, 14 of them were executed (four were hanged, ten were shot). The rest were sentenced to prison, sent to labor camps, or deported. None of these people were involved in the murder of Biba, but all were considered supporters of the Mountain Committee.

The armed resistance continued for about another year. Attempts were made to coordinate with the CIA in an operation to transport paratroopers to Albania. Sigurimi carried out a special operation involving the introduction of party functionary Pal Melyshi, a personal friend of Biba, who was eager to take revenge, into the rebel detachment. On April 12, 1950, Melushi was killed by “ friendly fire ” from state security. The repressions greatly undermined the position of the Mountain Committee. Since the early 1950s, active operations have gradually ceased. Mirdita became the last region of Albania over which the power of the Communists was established.

== Fates and memory ==
Gjon Markagjoni remained an authoritative figure in the Albanian political emigration and continued to lead the NNB, he died in Rome in 1966. Ndue Markagjoni moved to the United States and joined the Free Albania National Committee. He returned to Albania in 1994, after the fall of the communist regime in 1992. He died in Queens in 2011. Ndue Pjeter Gjomarkaj, after the defeat of the committee, he managed to escape Albania and flee to Canada. He Returned to Albania, then moved to Italy where he died in 2013. Ndue Gjon Melyshi emigrated to the USA. He fled the country in 1952, moving first to Yugoslavia, Italy and West Germany, and eventually settling in the United States, where he lived until 1992. Melyshi died in Shkodër, on 31 July 2020 at the age of 109 years.

The attitude towards the Mountain Committee in modern Albania is extremely divided. Albanian staunch Communists and a handful of leftists assess the organization as extremely reactionary, recalling “atrocious crimes, pointing out that even the “mountain canon” was violated - a traditional custom prohibiting the killing of women and relatives. Due to the killings of the Tarazhi sisters. Supporters of the Socialist Party (the successor party of the Communist Party), criticize their political opponents from the Democratic Party. They draw a comparison between their opponents and the leaders of the Mountain Committee. Right-wing anti-communists take this side of committees reputation into account, although they classify the organization as a force of anti-totalitarian resistance and positively evaluate its leaders when examined individually.

In May 2018, Albanian television showed the documentary Bardhok Biba, vrasja që terrorizoi Mirditën - Bardhok Biba. The murder that terrorized Mirdita. The documentary describes the story of Biba's murder and political repression in Mirdita. 109-year-old Ndue Gjon Melyshi took part in the filming.
