= Lëkurësi Castle =

Ruined castle in Vlorë County, Albania

- Kalaja e Lëkurësit
- Sarandë Albania
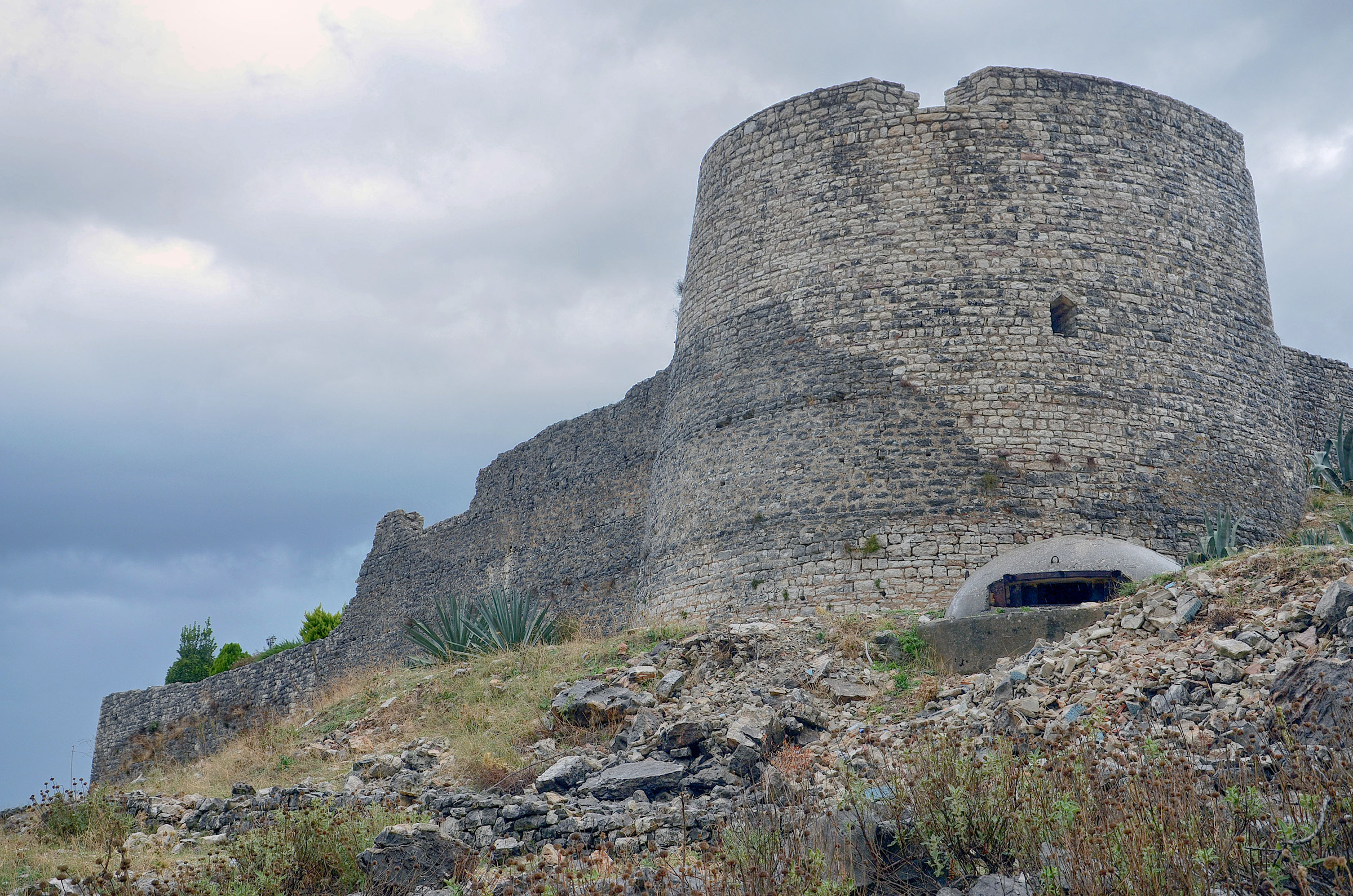

Site information
- Type: Castle
- Owner: Albania
- Controlled by: Ottoman Empire; Albania
- Open to the public: Yes

Location
- Coordinates: 39.8659°N 20.02567°E

Site history
- Built: 1537
- Built by: Suleiman the Magnificent
- Materials: Stone

Garrison information
- Garrison: 220 Soldiers

Lëkurësi Castle (Albanian: Kalaja e Lëkurësit) is a ruined Ottoman Turkish castle near Sarandë, southern Albania. The castle is on a strategic hill point overlooking the town of Sarandë, southeast of the town centre. From here one can control the whole town as well as the islands of Ksamil.

== Description ==
The Lëkurësi castle is located around 1 km southeast of Saranda. It is almost square in shape, and has two round towers at opposite corners, where its loopholes are also found. The best preserved parts of the castle are its southern and eastern sides. The castle offers control over Saranda, Butrint and the Straits of Corfu.

== History ==
Lëkurësi Castle was built in 1537 by Sultan Suleiman the Magnificent of the Ottoman Empire. It was built in order to defend against the Venetians. It held a garrison of 220 soldiers as well. The region traditionally belonged to the southern part of the region of Himara. At the end of the 18th century, the castle was attacked by Ali Pasha of Ioannina and the surrounding habitation raided.

On the western slope of the hill there was a village named Lëkurës until the 19th century. It seems that it had a larger population than Saranda.

Between 28 February and 4 March 1878 the castle and the nearby lands were the sight of an Albanian-Greek conflict when Greek rebels led by Georgios Stephanou engaged with Albanian locals in the village of Lëkurës, Saranda, Karalibej and Gjashtë. The fighting culminated in a siege of the castle where the retreating Greeks had taken refuge. The siege ended in a victory for the Albanians, ending the Greek revolt.

== Gallery ==
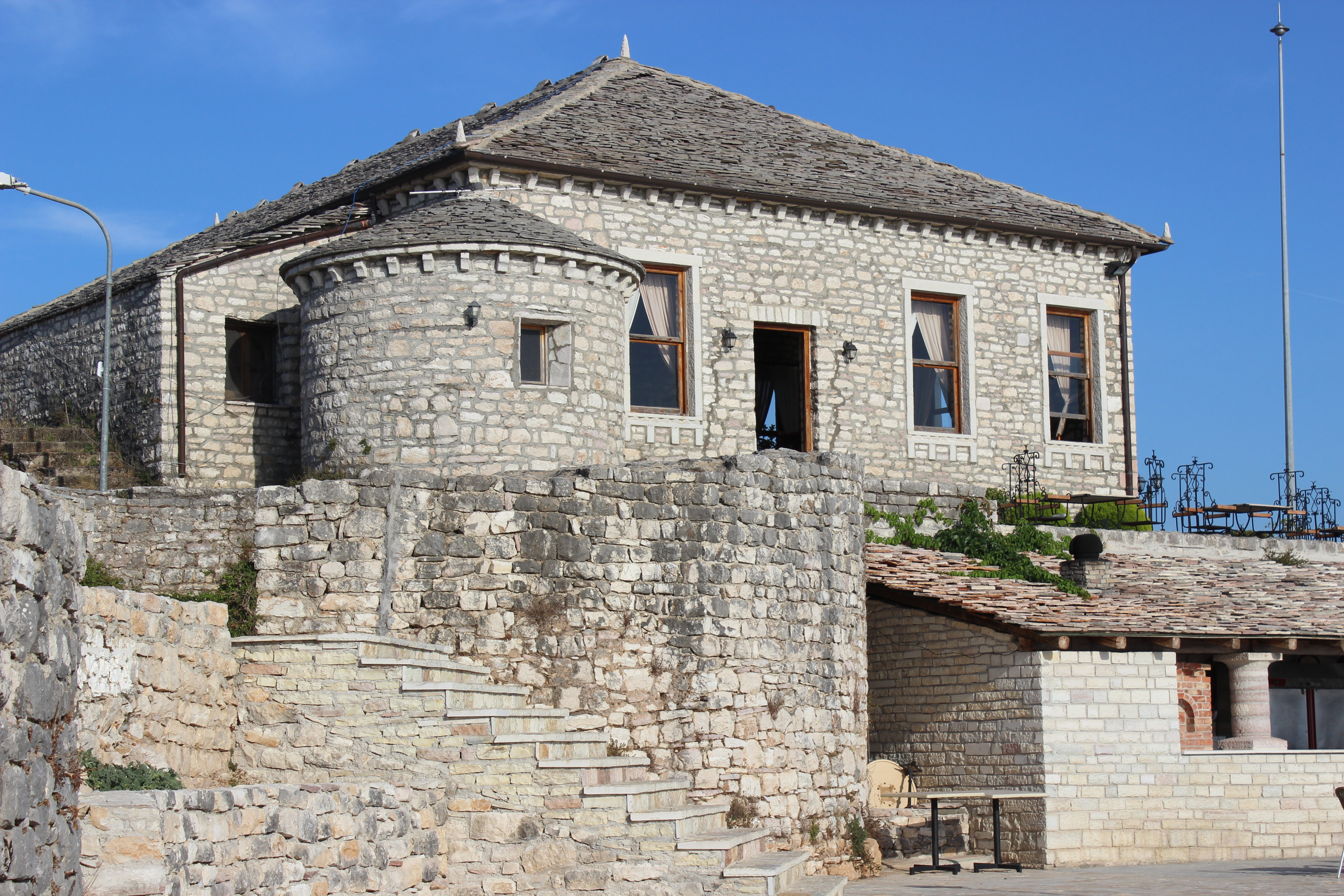

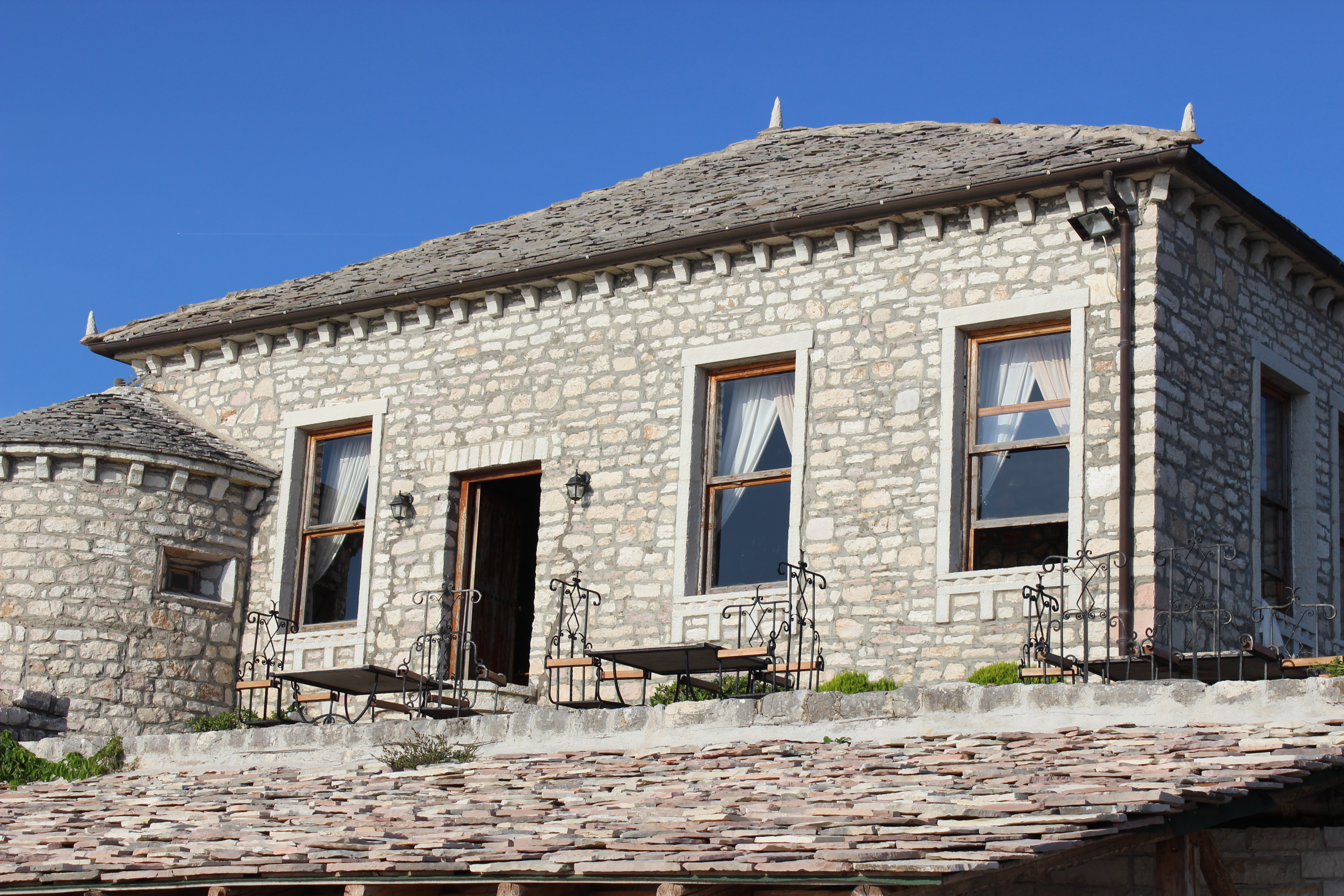

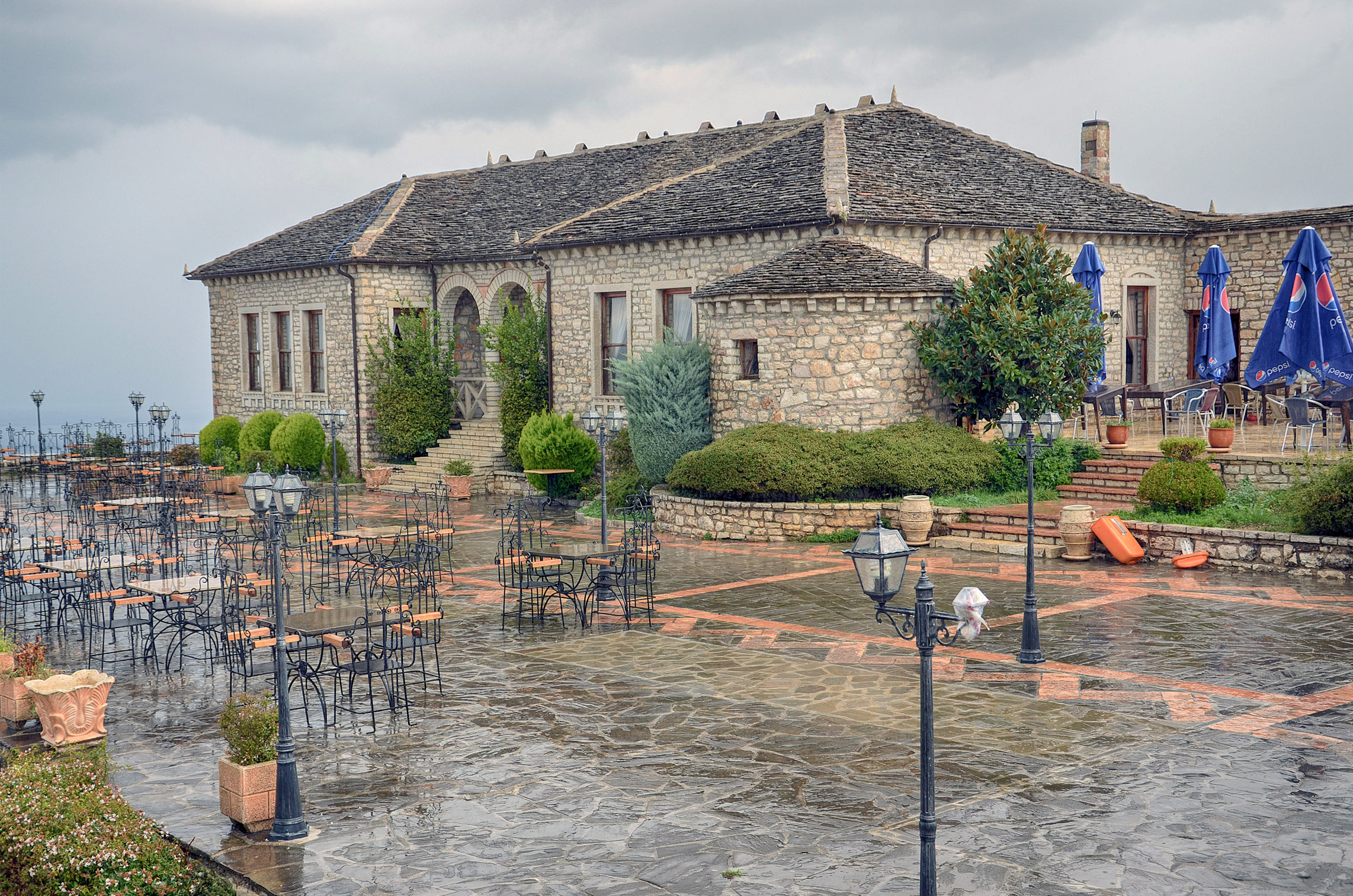

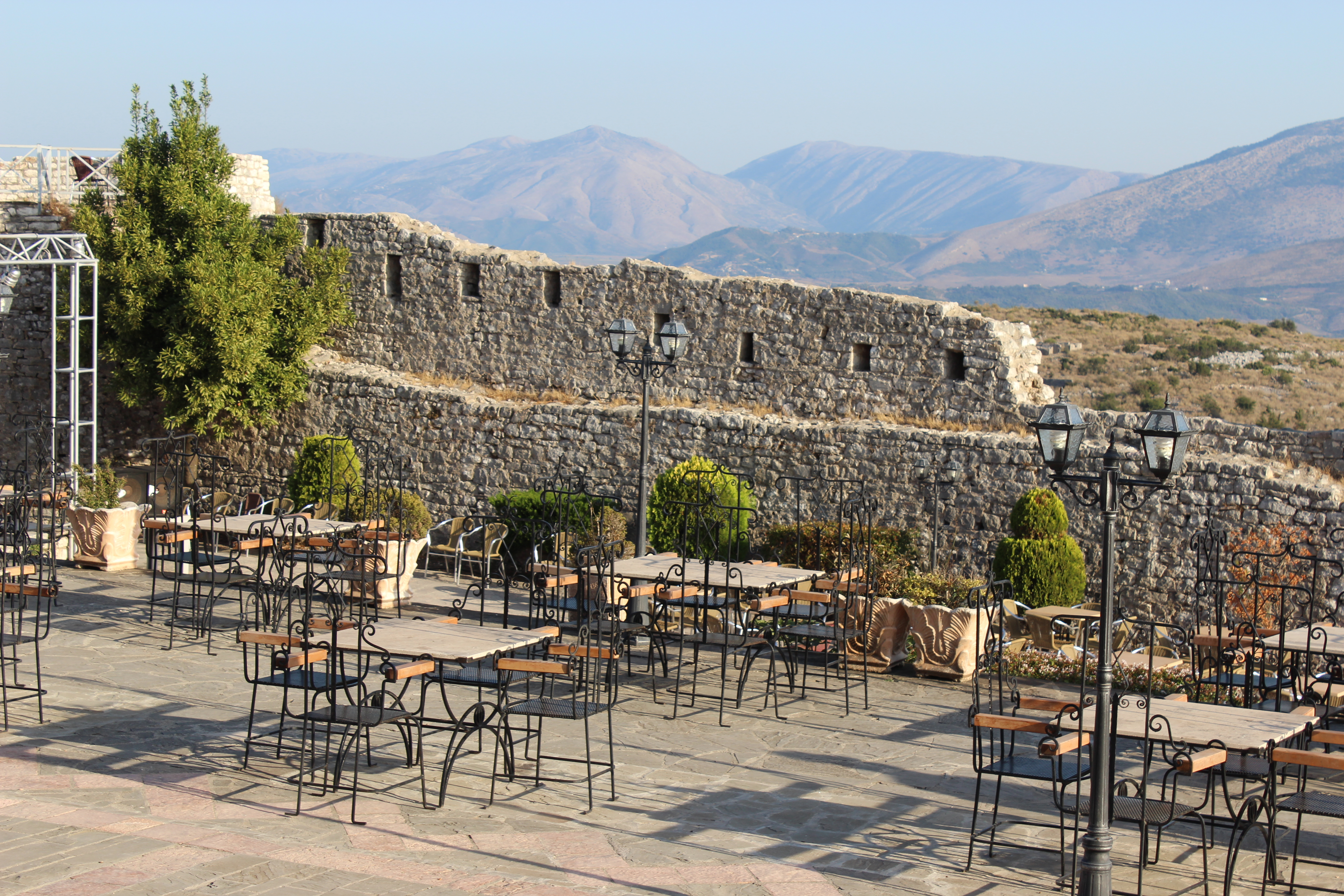

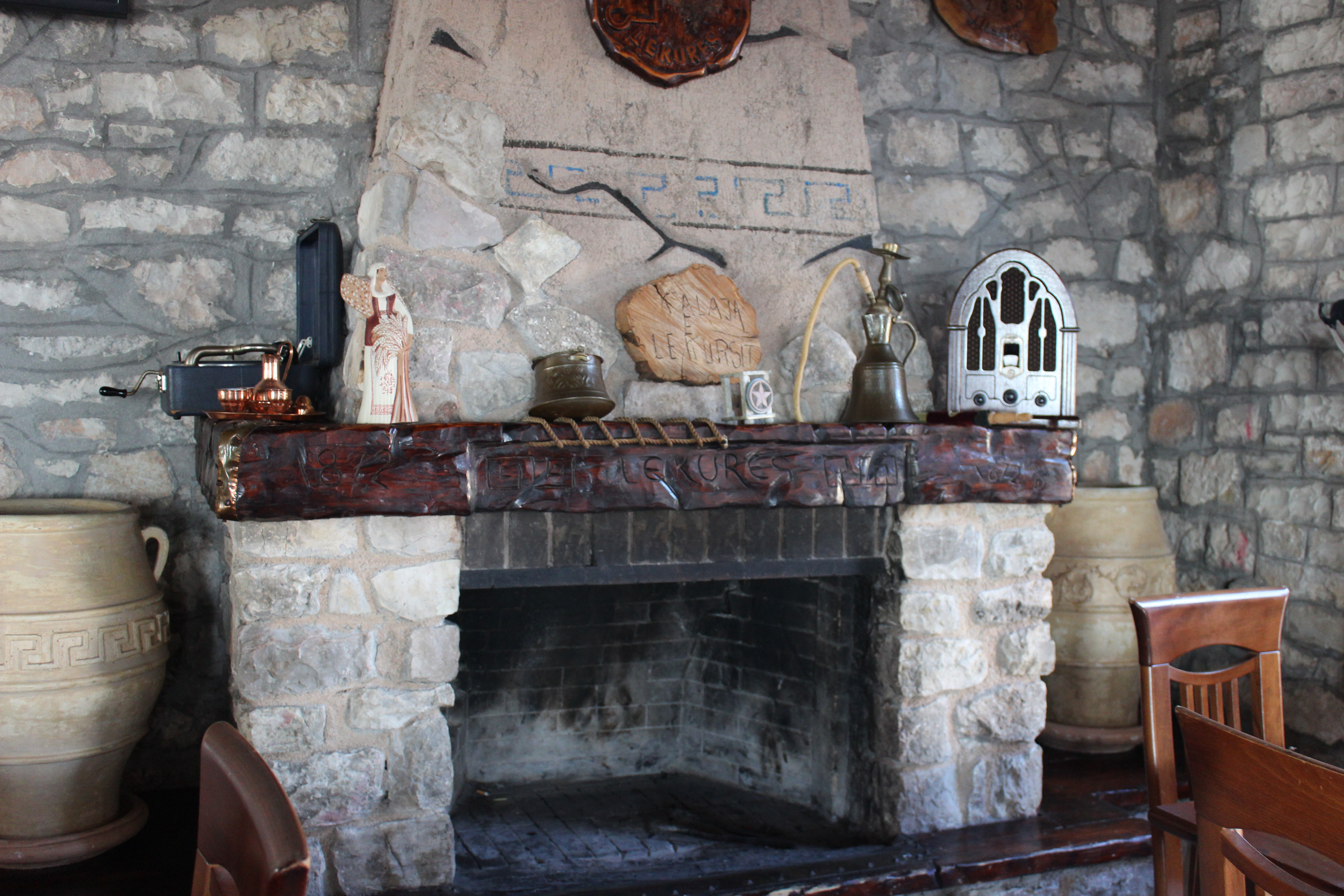

== See also ==
- Saranda
- List of castles in Albania
- Tourism in Albania
- Albanian Riviera
- History of Albania
