= Kelmendi uprising =

1945 Albanian rebellion

Kelmendi Uprising
- Part of the anti-communist insurgencies in Central and Eastern Europe
Date	January – February 1945
Location	Albania, Accursed Mountains, Kelmend Region
Result	Communist Victory: Suppression of the rebellion in Kelmendi; Government Power is Established over the Kelmendi Region

Belligerents
Albania	The Kelmendi Tribe

Commanders and leaders
Mehmet Shehu; Shefqet Peçi; Fejzi Micoli †	Prek Cali (executed); Ndre Zadeja (executed)

Units involved
Sigurimi 1st Strike Brigade, 23rd and 24th LANÇ Brigades	Free Albania National Committee

Strength
300	300 Albanian Anti-Communists from Kelmendi

Casualties and losses
52 partisan casualties	150 (100 civilians, 50 fighters)

The Kelmendi Uprising (Albanian: Kryengritja e Kelmendit) was an anti-communist armed uprising in Albania on January 15, 1945, in the Albanian region of Kelmendi. During the events described, it was part of the Shkodër district, now the Malesia e Madhe district in the Shkodër region. The Kelmendi tribe inhabited the Accursed Mountains Most of the Kelmendi were Catholic, though some were Muslim.

== Background ==
By the mid-1940s, the mountains of northern Albania had retained a stable social structure, with tribal authorities exercising significant power in a system with elements of military democracy. These isolated communities were characterized by widespread poverty and illiteracy but remained deeply committed to traditional values and social order. The tribal leader, or bayraktar, wielded administrative authority and commanded an armed militia. The Catholic Church exerted considerable influence, and traditionalist sentiments prevailed, alongside nationalism and hostility towards Slavic neighbors, especially Yugoslavia. Broad autonomy was viewed as a given, and state power was considered suspicious.

Since the early 1910s, the Kelmendi bajraktari had been Prek Cali, a nationalist and traditionalist who fought for Albanian independence. During World War II, Cali fought alongside the Italian fascists, but on a platform of anti-communism, and even collaborated with the Chetniks.

== Rebellion ==
Prek Cali became a staunch opponent of the Communist Party of Albania, which came to power in November 1944. He found support among the Kelmendi, who, like many northern Albanians, remained loyal to the traditional social order and resisted state interference. Cali participated in meetings with anti-communist activists, clan leaders, and Catholic priests, where plans were made to keep the communists out of the north.

Cali commanded a force of about 1,000 men, consisting of the Kelmendi tribal militia and gendarmerie units. Among his comrades were army officers like Zef Toma, tribal leaders such as Gjon Bajraktari, and the Catholic priest and renowned writer Ndre Zadeja.

This force was part of the broader military-political infrastructure of northern Albanian anti-communists, coordinating with other groups like Balli Kombëtar, the Malesi e Madhe militia, and the Markagjoni resistance in Mirdite. Cali's closest ally was Lesh Marashi, with whom he coordinated operations. At a meeting on January 13, 1945, Cali declared that he had no intention of "remaining idle." In response, several hundred militiamen were mobilized under his command.

In early 1945, Enver Hoxha’s communist regime sought to establish control over northern Albania. This effort was overseen by Mehmet Shehu, the second-in-command of the Communist Party. By November 1944, Shehu had reported the deployment of military units to the Malesi e Madhe district and the readiness to suppress nationalist resistance. Initially, the 2nd and 4th battalions of the 24th Brigade were assigned to Kelmendi, but adjustments were made, and on December 24, 1944, the 1st Shock Brigade moved into the region, led by Shefqet Peci.

The communists expected a quick victory, supported by a small local faction that misrepresented the general sentiment of the population as welcoming the communists. Beito Faslija, a highlander appointed as the region’s military commander, promised that a new government would be established through negotiations with the Kelmendi. However, Fasliya’s efforts to limit repression clashed with the hardline stance of both the Communist Party and the anti-communist resistance led by Cali.

Cali attempted to negotiate with the communist leadership, but his efforts were ignored.

The Battle at the Bridge

On January 15, 1945, a battalion of 300 men from the 1st Shock Brigade, under the command of Fejzi Micoli, approached the village of Tamara. That day, the Kelmendi rebels launched a fierce ambush at a bridge over the Cem River. Under the leadership of Mirash Rukaj, Cali’s militia set up strategic positions in the mountains. Although the communists were roughly equal in number to the Kelmendi, the tactical advantage belonged to the rebels, who fired from higher ground, leaving the communists unable to mount an effective defense. With no radio communication to call for reinforcements, the battalion was left vulnerable.

The battle resulted in significant communist casualties, with 46 killed in the fighting, including Micoli. This was the greatest defeat in the history of the 1st Shock Brigade. The rebels suffered between 25 and 44 casualties, retreating into the mountains after the battle.

== Aftermath ==
In response, the Communist Party launched a brutal crackdown. Reinforced brigades, security units, and party militias flooded the region. Under the leadership of Mehmet Shehu, this overwhelming force crushed the resistance. Prominent commanders, including Gjon Bajraktari and Zef Toma, were killed, and around 150 Kelmendi were executed. Cali and 15 others took refuge in a fortified cave, but after days of fighting, they surrendered under false promises of safety Prek Cali was arrested by Shehu, and the subsequent trial in Shkodër led to 14 death sentences, including for Prek Cali, Ndre Zadeja, and others. They were executed on March 25, 1945.

== See also ==
- Communist purges in Albania in 1944-1947
