= Abu Hamza =

Abu Hamza (Arabic: أبو حمزة) meaning father of Hamza, is a given name and a common alias used by several people, it may refer to:

== Given name ==
- Abu Hamza al-Mukhtar, 8th century Ibadi Kharijite rebel
- Abu Hamza Rabia (died 2005), al-Qaeda leader
- Abu Hamza Al-Qurashi, Islamic spokesman
- Abu Hamza al-Thumali (died 772), disciple of Ali al-Rida
- Abu Hamza (died 2025), spokesman of the military wing of the Palestinian Islamic Jihad

== Surname ==
- Mona Abou Hamze (née Abu Alwan; born 1968), Lebanese TV personality and presenter

== Alias ==
- Zabiuddin Ansari (born 1980), Lashkar-e-Taiba militant involved in 2008 Mumbai attacks, known as Abu Hamza
- Mahmoud al-Majzoub (1965–2006), leader of the Palestinian Islamic Jihad
- Abu Hamza al-Masri (born Mustafa Kamel Mustafa in 1958), Egyptian Muslim cleric, former imam of Finsbury Park mosque in London, imprisoned in the US
- Faheem Khalid Lodhi (born 1969), Australian convicted of militancy, known as Abu Hamza
- Samir Mohtadi, Australian Muslim cleric known as Abu Hamza
- Abu Hamza al-Muhajir (1968–2011), leader of Al-Qaeda in Iraq
- Pierre Vogel (born 1978), German Muslim preacher, also known as Abu Hamza
