= Battle of Tamara Bridge =

- Part of World War II in Albania
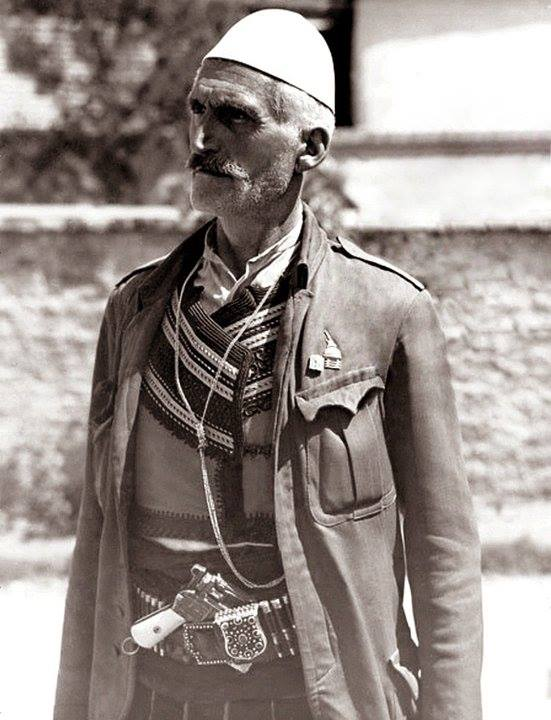
- Prek Cali
Date	15 January 1945
Location	Northern Albania
Result	Yugoslav–Albanian Partisan victory

Belligerents
LANÇ; Yugoslav Partisans	Kelmendi tribal forces

Commanders and leaders
Unknown	Prek Cali (executed)

Casualties and losses
52 killed	150 killed

The Battle of Tamara Bridge was a battle which occurred on 15 January 1945 at the tail end of World War II in Albania between the communist-led Albanian Partisan forces against the Kelmendi tribal forces of Northern Albania headed by Prek Cali. It was the last major battle that occurred in Albania during World War 2 and the last major anti-communist battle to occur in the country.

== Background ==
Prek Cali was a major chieftain of the Kelmendi tribe and participated in a variety of battles, notably against Montenegrin forces but also against Yugoslav Partisans. By the time the Albanian Civil War erupted in 1943, Cali sided with the anti-communist forces despite not formal political affiliation. However, by the time the communists took over Tirana in November 1944, rapid movements to the north of Albania began.

== Battle ==
On the 15 January 1945, little over a month and a half after the communists took control of Albania, a major military operation was launched by the Albanian Partisans (chiefly the 1st Brigade, 23rd Brigade, and 24th Brigade) with assistance from the Yugoslav Partisans as well. Prek Cali alongside Catholic priest Dom Ndre Zandeja banded together with other Albanian tribes from the Nikaj-Mërtur region and the Dukagjin highlands. The battle lasted for a day and culminated in a large loss of life; 52 partisans were killed in action while 150 Kelmendi tribesmen were killed. Coli would subsequently be arrested and killed some two months later, alongside Albanian Catholic priest Dom Ndre Zadeja by a communist trial.

== Legacy ==
The defeat of the Kelmendi tribe at the hands of the communist forces led to a radical transformation of the region for the following half century, notably the breakup of the centuries-old Albanian tribal system that had preoccupied northern Albanian life since the 15th century as well as economic poverty in an already impoverished area in addition to many attempted escapes. The region suffered from a demographic collapsed by the 1990s due to emigration abroad.
