= Communist purges in Albania in 1944-1947 =

After seizing power in 1944, communists in Albania carried out systematic political purges against intellectuals, nationalists, officers, religious figures and perceived opponents, many of whom were arrested and executed without trial. These purges, marked by terror and secrecy, aimed to eliminate all real or potential dissent and consolidate totalitarian control over the country. They marked an important chapter of the Albanian Civil War during 1943-1944 and the years that followed.

== Purge during liberation ==
Communists targeted activists of the Legality Movement and Balli Kombëtar, considering them as collaborators with the Nazi Regime. During the movement for Liberation purges started as well as persecution of collaborators.

On October 29, 1943, the Peza penal unit massacred two young nationalists named Besnik Çano, 22 years old, and Qeramudin Sulo, 21 years old. Both of them were participants in the Conference of Mukje.

In October 1943, Mehmet Shehu, shot without trial in Priska, 13 gendarmes who surrendered in good faith to the First Assault Brigade, to fight with them against the German Occupation. Among the killed gendarmes were Preng Marku, Zef Ndoc Simoni, Preng Lek Shkreli, Pjetër Shkalleshi and Captain Ali Maksuti. Later, they also killed Professor Lorenc Rasha.

== 1944 - 1947 ==
The communist takeover in Albania was marked by escalating violence, including the killing of 36 civilians in the Kukës region, the arrest and brutal torture of Catholic clergy such as Dom Lazër Shantoja, the public execution of political prisoners in Tirana, and the eventual execution of prominent Catholic figures in Shkodër for their opposition to atheistic communism under fabricated charges of collaboration.

On 17 February 1945, Enver Hoxha approved the death sentences of seven political opponents issued by the Military Court of the Second Corps Military District in Berat, in proceedings marked by political retaliation and the absence of legal due process.

On 4 March 1946, the execution in Shkodër of six Catholic clergy and laymen marked the beginning of the communist regime's systematic persecution of the Catholic Church in Albania.

Based on a report from the Shkodër District Command to the People's Defense Division in Tirana, 39 individuals were executed by communist forces between April and October 1946, classified as “political criminals,” including resistance members and civilians who had aided fugitives, some of whom were re-arrested and killed despite having previously surrendered or been released.

In 1947, the Albanian communist regime carried out the execution and political elimination of opposition figures known collectively as the “Groups of Deputies.” These trials, held between 1946 and 1948, targeted members of parliament and prominent intellectuals who had initially been part of the Democratic Front but later voiced opposition within the legislature. The most significant trial took place in September 1947 at the “17 November” cinema in Tirana, where 24 individuals were prosecuted; 16 were sentenced to death, including five members of parliament. The defendants were accused of forming an alleged traitorous and sabotage organization linked to foreign powers and of attempting to overthrow the “people's power.” Historians widely regard these charges as fabricated and the trials as politically motivated, aimed at silencing dissent and consolidating the regime's control.

The executed and imprisoned figures represented a small but influential intellectual elite, many of whom had studied at leading European universities and came from well-known patriotic families. Beyond the executions, their relatives were subjected to internment, persecution, and long-term exclusion from public life, effectively dismantling entire intellectual and civic traditions.

== Execution of religious figures ==
From 1944 until 1949 there were 63 victims from the catholic clergy, many of them beatified and announced as martyrs from Pope Francis in 2016. They were persecuted, arrested, tortured and killed without trial for being perceived as enemies of the newly established regime.
