= Hamza Pasha =

Hamza Pasha (Turkish: Hamza Paşa) may refer to:

- Hamza Bey (died 1462), Ottoman commander, bey of Nicopolis
- Hamza Pasha, governor of Thessaly, Ottoman governor of Thessaly (1459-1462) in succession of Turahanoğlu Ömer Bey
- Hamza Pasha, beylerbey of Egypt (1683–87) and wali of Damascus (1688–89), see List of Ottoman governors of Egypt
- Tevkii Hamza Hamid Pasha, Ottoman Grand Vizier (1763)
- Silahdar Mahir Hamza Pasha, Ottoman governor of Egypt (1765–67) and Grand Vizier (1768)
- Mahmoud Hamza Pasha, Admiral of the Egyptian Navy (1946–1948)
