= Georgios Stephanou =

Greek revolutionary

Georgios Stephanou (Greek: Γεώργιος Στεφάνου; 1824–1901) was a Greek gendarmerie officer and revolutionary. He was one of the leaders of the Greek revolt in Epirus in 1878.

== Biography ==
Stephanou was born in 1824 in Qeparo, Himara, Ottoman Empire, in modern southern Albania. He joined the Greek gendarmerie in 1849. In 1877, in an effort to take advantage of the ongoing Russo-Turkish War, he received orders from Greek government to discuss with the Albanian beys of the regions of Kurvelesh and Himara, a combined armed uprising in Epirus and Albania, both regions being under Ottoman rule that time. However the new cabinet of Alexandros Koumoundouros rejected the possibility of an alliance with Albanians and preferred the idea of a Greek revolution in Ottoman Epirus.

In 1878, as a gendarmerie major he was appointed as one of the leaders of an anti-Ottoman revolt in Epirus, leading a group of 700 Greek Epirotes. His troops landed in the coastal region of Sarandë on February 11, 1878. They took control of the coastal strip opposite Corfu and the surrounding in the region of Delvinë, as well as the coastal settlement of Saranda. The revolt initially spread to the adjacent regions. However, a numerically superior Ottoman force of 6,000 arrived, supported by Ottoman-Albanian irregulars, and suppressed the uprising. Stephanou escaped to Souli and from there returned to Greece.

He reached the rank of colonel. He died at 1901.

== Sources ==
- Kaphetzopoulos Ioannis; Flokas Charalambos; Dima-Dimitriou Angelliki (2000). The Struggle for Northern Epirus (1.udg. ed.). Athens: Hellenic Army General Staff, Army History Directorate. ISBN 9789607897404.
- Skoulidas, Ilias. "Οι Σχέσεις Ελλήνων και Αλβανών κατά το 19ο Αιώνα: Πολιτικές Επιδιώξεις και Θεωρήσεις (1875 - 1897) [The Relations between the Greeks and the Albanians during the 19th Century: Political Aspirations and Visions (1875 - 1897)]". www.didaktorika.gr (in Greek). University of Ioannina.
