= Gjashtë =

- Village
- Location within Albania
- Coordinates: 39°52′29″N 20°1′30″E
- Country: Albania
- County: Vlorë
- Municipality: Sarandë
- Time zone: UTC+1 (CET)
  - Summer (DST): UTC+2 (CEST)
- Postal Code: 9703

Gjashtë (Albanian definite form: Gjashta) is a village in the municipality of Sarandë, Vlorë County, southwestern Albania.

== Name ==
The name of the village comes from the Albanian Gjashtë meaning Six.
