= Prek Cali =

Albanian soldier (1872–1945) involved in the Albanian National Awakening

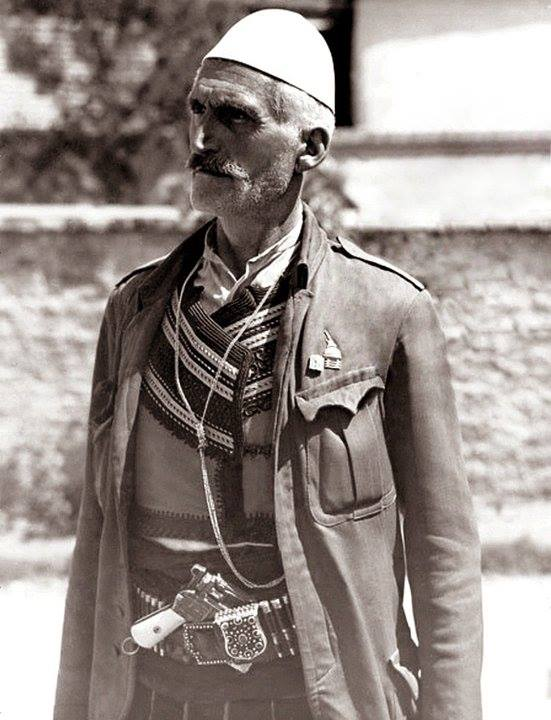
- Born: 29 July 1872; Vermosh, Scutari Vilayet, Ottoman Empire (now Albania)
- Died: 25 March 1945 (aged 72); Shkodër, Albania
- Burial place: Kelmend
- Military career
- Service years: 1908–1945
- Rank: Commander
- Commands: Kelmend
- Conflicts: Albanian revolt of 1908; Albanian revolt of 1911; Albania during the Balkan Wars; Uprising in Montenegro; Battle of Tamara Bridge

Prek Cali (29 July 1872 – 25 March 1945), Prenk Cali or Preng Cali, was an Albanian bajraktar ("standard-bearer") of Vermosh, part of the Kelmendi tribe of northern Albania. He was a veteran of the Albanian uprisings and the Balkan Wars. He was executed by Albanian Partisans in 1945.

== Early life and rebellions ==
Cali was born in Vermosh, part of the Kelmendi tribe, at the time part of the Scutari Vilayet (now northern Albania). He became the bajraktar ("flag-bearer") of Kelmendi.

After the fall of Fan S. Noli's cabinet (1924), Cali came in conflict with King Ahmet Zogu. He led his tribe against Montenegrin forces.

== World War II ==
=== Plav and Gusinje ===
At the beginning of World War II Prek Cali had between 200 and 1,200 armed men around Vermosh under his command before Italian forces occupied it. With the approval of the Plava and Gucija Committee for Salvation, his forces took control over Plav and Gusinje declared the region united with Albania and raised the Albanian flag on the municipal building. Cali participated in the Italian counter-offensive in August 1941, crushing the Uprising in Montenegro. Italian General Alessandro Pirzio Biroli reported that Albanian forces from Vermosh commanded by Cali supported Division Venezia that advanced from Podgorica to insurgent-controlled Kolašin and Andrijevica and re-occupied them despite fierce resistance.

== Death ==
By the end of the war, the main military and political force of the country, the Albanian Communist Partisans, concentrated towards the north of Albania in order to destroy the anti-Communist forces and to eliminate their rivals. They met an open resistance in Nikaj-Mërtur (now in Tropojë District), Dukagjin and Kelmend, whose chieftains were openly anti-Communists. On 15 January 1945, a battle between the 1st Brigade Partisans (supported later by the 23rd and 24th brigades plus Yugoslav Partisan forces) and anti-Communist forces was fought at the Tamara Bridge. The Partisans had 52 losses. About 150 Kelmendi people were killed. Their leader Prek Cali was surrounded in a cave in Vukël for a week, after which he surrendered. He was executed by the Communists on the feast day of Palm Sunday.

== Legacy ==
After fall of communism in Albania, Prëk Cali was decorated and honored with the Medal "Martyr of Democracy" in 1993 by President of Albania Sali Berisha. Seven years later, in 2010, then-current President of Albania Bujar Nishani honored him with Order "Honor of Nation". In 2000 the monument of Prek Cali was set put in Shkodër.

=== Controversy ===
Mehdi Frashëri, the Prime Minister of Albania's Quisling government under Nazi Germany, believed that after Cali's death, Albanian and Yugoslav communists disseminated stories about Prëk Cali being a fascist, enemy of Albania, and secret supporter of Chetniks. Frashëri believed such accounts were untrue because Cali and his whole family fought together with the Kelmendi tribe against 800 Serbians, and in August 1912/1913 protected the northern borders of Albania. The claims of cooperation between Chetniks and Cali are believed by many post-communist Albanian historians to be an Albanian-Yugoslavian communist propaganda, since Prek Cali was condemned by the Communists as "a reactionary and anti-Slavic chauvinist".

=== Literature ===
Mihailo Lalić (1914–1992) mentioned Cali in his short story Posljednje brdo (1967) and novel Pramen Tame (1979), and included him in his collection of memoirs.

== Sources ==
- Blumi, Isa (2011). Reinstating the Ottomans: Alternative Balkan Modernities, 1800-1912. Palgrave Macmillan. ISBN 978-0-230-11908-6.
- Marović, Miodrag (1995). Balkanski Džoker: Albanija i Albanci: istorijska hronika nastajanja i razvoja albanskog pitanja. Kulturni centar. ISBN 978-86-7004-005-2.
- Martini, Luigj (2005). Prek Cali, Kelmendi dhe kelmendasit. Camaj-Pipaj. ISBN 978-99943-34-07-0.
- Milovanović, Nikola B.; Kljaković, Vojmir (1985). Draža Mihailović. Centar za informacije i publicitet.
- Narod andrijevičkog sreza (1978). VATRE sa Komova: Narod andrijevičkog sreza u NOP 1941-1945. Mjesni odbor SUBNORA-a.
- Pajović, Radoje (1987). Pavle Đurišić (in Serbo-Croatian). Zagreb, Yugoslavia: Centar za informacije i publicitet. ISBN 978-86-7125-006-1.
- Pajović, Radoje (1977). Kontrarevolucija u Crnoj Gori: Četnički i federalistički pokret 1941–1945 (in Serbo-Croatian). Cetinje, Yugoslavia: Obod.
- Redžić, Vučeta (2002). Građanski rat u Crnoj Gori: Dešavanja od sredine 1942. godine do sredine 1945. godine. Stupovi.
