= European War =

European War may refer to:

- Various armed conflicts in Europe Like the napoleonic wars
- Initial North American term for World War I
- European theatre of World War II
