= List of Albanian royal consorts =

This is an archontological list of Albanian consorts, containing consorts of the medieval Albanian states, to heads of state of modern Albania.

== Principality of Arbanon (1190–1257) ==
=== Princess Consorts of Arbanon ===
Picture	Name	Father	Birth	Marriage	Became Consort	Ceased to be Consort	Death	Spouse
	Komnena Nemanjić	Stefan Nemanjić (Nemanjić)	c. 1194	1208-1210		c. 1215 (Husband's death)	12??	Dhimitër Progoni
	Komnena Nemanjić	Stefan Nemanjić (Nemanjić)	c. 1194	c. 1216		12?? (Husband's death)	12??	Grigor Kamona
	unknown	Grigor Kamona		12??		1257 (Husbands abdication)		Golem of Kruja

== Principality of Gropa (1258–1395) ==
=== Princess Consorts of Gropa ===
Picture	Name	Father	Birth	Marriage	Became Consort	Ceased to be Consort	Death	Spouse
	Chiranna Muzaka	Andrea II Muzaka (Muzaka)						Andrea Gropa

== Principality of Blinishti (13th century–1330) ==
No details about the Princess consorts of Blinishti are known.

== Kingdom of Albania (1272–1368 & 1376-1383) ==
=== Queen Consorts of Albania ===
Picture	Name	Father	Birth	Marriage	Became Consort	Ceased to be Consort	Death	Spouse
	Margaret of Burgundy	Eudes of Burgundy (Burgundy)	1250	18 November 1268	February 1272 (Husband took title)	7 January 1285 (Husband's death)	4 September 1308	Charles I
	Maria of Hungary	Stephen V of Hungary (Árpád)	1257	May-June 1270	7 January 1285 (Husband's ascension)	1294 (Husband relinquish title)	25 March 1323	Charles II
	Thamar Angelina Komnene	Nikephoros I Komnenos Doukas (Angelos)		13 August 1294		1309 (Divorced)	1311	Philip I
	Catherine of Achaea	Charles of Valois (Valois)	1303	29 July 1313		26 December 1331 (Husband's death)	1346	Philip I

=== Duchess and Duke Consorts of Durrës ===
Picture	Name	Father	Birth	Marriage	Became Consort	Ceased to be Consort	Death	Spouse
	Agnes of Périgord	Helie VII, Count of Périgord (Talleyrand-Périgord)		14 November 1321	1332 (Husband's ascension)	5 April 1336 (Husband's death)	1345	John, Duke of Durazzo
	Maria of Calabria	Charles, Duke of Calabria (Anjou)	6 May 1329	21 April 1343		23 January 1348 (Husband's death)	20 May 1366	Charles, Duke of Durazzo
	Louis, Duke of Durazzo reigned as co-Duke	Philip III of Navarre (Évreux)	1341	1365		1376		Joanna, Duchess of Durazzo
	Robert IV of Artois, Count of Eu reigned as co-Duke	John of Artois, Count of Eu (Artois)	1356	1376		1383 (Kingdom abolished)	20 July 1387	Joanna, Duchess of Durazzo

== Principality of Muzaka (1279–1450) ==
=== Princess Consorts of Muzaka ===
Picture	Name	Father	Birth	Marriage	Became Consort	Ceased to be Consort	Death	Spouse
		Pal Gropa (Gropa)						Teodor I Muzaka
	Euphemia Mataranga	Paul Mataranga (Mataranga)		c. 1328	1331	1372 (Husband's death)		Andrea II Muzaka
	Chiranna Zenevisi, Lady of Grabossa	Gjon Zenebishi (Zenebishi)	-	-	-	-	-	Andrea III Muzaka

== Principality of Mataranga (1358–1367) ==
No details about the Princess consorts of Mataranga are known.

== Principality of Gjonima (13th century-1430) ==
No details about the Princess consorts of Gjonima are known.

== Principality of Albania (1328–1415) ==
=== Princess and Prince Consorts of Albania ===
Picture	Name	Father	Birth	Marriage	Became Consort	Ceased to be Consort	Death	Spouse
	Hélène of Anjou	Robert, King of Naples (Anjou)	c. 1300s	1338		1342 (Husband executed)	1342 (Executed)	Andrea I Thopia
	Voisava Balsha	Balsha I (Balsha)		1370		1388 (Husband's death)		Karl Thopia
	Teodora Branković	Branko Mladenović (Branković)				1392 (Husband's death)		Gjergj Thopia
	Marco Barbarigo	???? (Barbarigo)		13??	1388	1394 (Exiled)	1428	Helena Thopia
	Konstantin Balsha	Gjergj I Balsha (Balsha)	fl. 1378	1394		1402		Helena Thopia

== Principality of Vlorë (1345–1417) ==
=== Princess and Prince Consorts of Vlorë ===
Picture	Name	Father	Birth	Marriage	Became Consort	Ceased to be Consort	Death	Spouse
	Anna Palaiologina	Andronikos Angelos Palaiologos (Angelos)	-	c. 1350		1363 (Husband's death)	-	John Komnenos Asen
	Balsha II	Balsha I (Balsha)		1372		18 September 1385		Comita Muzaka
	Mrkša Žarković	Žarko (Žarković)	1363	1391	1396	October 1414		Rugjina Balsha

== Principality of Zeta (1356–1421) ==
=== Princess Consorts of Balsha ===
Picture	Name	Father	Birth	Marriage	Became Consort	Ceased to be Consort	Death	Spouse
	Irene Duklina							Strazimir Balsha
	Milica Mrnjavčević	Vukašin of Serbia (Mrnjavčević)						Strazimir Balsha
	Olivera Mrnjavčević	Vukašin of Serbia (Mrnjavčević)		before 1364				Gjergj Balsha I
	Teodora Dejanović Dragaš	Dejan (despot) (Dejanović)		after 1371				Gjergj Balsha I
	Comita Muzaka	Andrea II Muzaka (Muzaka)		1372	1378	1385 (Husband's death)	1396	Balsha II
	Jelena Lazarević	Lazar of Serbia (Lazarević)	1365-1366	1386		1403 (Husband's death)	1443	Gjergj Balsha II
	Mara Thopia	Niketa Thopia (Thopia)		1407		1410-1412		Balsha III
	Boglia Zaharia	Koja Zaharia (Zaharia)		1412-1413		1421 (Husband's death)		Balsha III

== Despot of Angelokastron and Lepanto (1358–1374) ==
=== Despotess consorts of Angelokastron and Lepanto ===
Picture	Name	Father	Birth	Marriage	Became Consort	Ceased to be Consort	Death	Spouse
	Irene Preljubović	Thomas Preljubović (Preljubović)				1374	1374	Gjin Bua Shpata

== Despotate of Arta (1360–1416) ==
=== Despotess Consorts of Arta ===
Picture	Name	Father	Birth	Marriage	Became Consort	Ceased to be Consort	Death	Spouse
	Irene Preljubović	Thomas Preljubović (Preljubović)				1374	1374	Gjin Bua Shpata
	Nerata							Muriq Shpata

== Principality of Gjirokastër (1386–1418) ==
=== Princess Consorts of Zenebishi ===
Picture	Name	Father	Birth	Marriage	Became Consort	Ceased to be Consort	Death	Spouse
	unknown	Gjin Bua Shpata (Shpata)						Gjon Zenebishi

== Principality of Dukagjini (1387–1479) ==
=== Princess Consorts of Dukagjini ===
Picture	Name	Father	Birth	Marriage	Became Consort	Ceased to be Consort	Death	Spouse
	Theodora Muzaka	Gjin II Muzaka			1468	1479		Lekë Dukagjini

== Principality of Arianiti (????–1462) ==
=== Princess Consorts of Arianiti ===
Picture	Name	Father	Birth	Marriage	Became Consort	Ceased to be Consort	Death	Spouse
	Maria Muzaka	Andrea III Muzaka (Muzaka)						Gjergj Arianiti
	Pietrina Francone	Oliviero Francone						Gjergj Arianiti
	Zanfina Muzaka	(Muzaka)						Moisi Golemi

== Principality of Kastrioti (1389–1444) ==
=== Princess Consorts of Kastrioti ===
Picture	Name	Father	Birth	Marriage	Became Consort	Ceased to be Consort	Death	Spouse
	Voisava Kastrioti	Domenico Moncino Musachi (Muzaka)		1390				Gjon Kastrioti

== Principality of Zaharia (1396–1444) ==
=== Princess Consorts of Zaharia ===
Picture	Name	Father	Birth	Marriage	Became Consort	Ceased to be Consort	Death	Spouse
	Bosa Dukagjini	Leka Dukagjini (Dukagjini)			1396	before 1442 (Husband's death)	September 19, 1448	Koja Zaharia
	Irene Dushmani	Lekë Dushmani (Dushmani)				1447 (Husband's death)		Lekë Zaharia

== League of Lezhë (1444–1479) ==
=== Princess Consorts of Albania ===
Picture	Name	Father	Birth	Marriage	Became Consort	Ceased to be Consort	Death	Spouse
	Donika Kastrioti	Gjergj Arianiti (Arianiti)	1428	1451		17 January 1468 (Husband's death)	1506	Gjergj Kastrioti
	Theodora Muzaka	Gjin II Muzaka			1468	1479		Lekë Dukagjini

== Pashalik of Shkodra (1757–1831) ==
No details about the Princess consorts of Shkodra are known.

== Pashalik of Berat (1774–1809) ==
No details about the Princess consorts of Berat are known.

== Pashalik of Ioannina (1788–1822) ==
=== Princess Consorts of Ioannina ===
Picture	Name	Father	Birth	Marriage	Became Consort	Ceased to be Consort	Death	Spouse
	Emine	Kaplan Pasha of Gjirokastër						Ali Pasha of Ioannina
	Kyra Vassiliki			1808		January 24, 1822 (Husband's death)	1834	Ali Pasha of Ioannina

== Principality of Albania (1914–1925) ==
=== Princess Consort of Albania ===
Picture	Name	Father	Birth	Marriage	Became Consort	Ceased to be Consort	Death	Spouse
	Sophie, Princess of Albania	Victor, Hereditary Prince of Schönburg-Waldenburg (Schönburg)	21 May 1885	30 November 1906	7 March 1914 (Husbands ascension)	31 January 1925 (Family exiled)	3 February 1936	Wilhelm, Prince of Albania

== Albanian Kingdom (1928–1939) ==
=== Queen Consort of Albania ===
Picture	Name	Father	Birth	Marriage	Became Consort	Ceased to be Consort	Death	Spouse
	Geraldine of Albania	Count Gyula Apponyi de Nagy-Apponyi (Apponyi)	6 August 1915	1938		9 April 1939 (Husband exiled)	22 October 2002	Zog I of Albania

== Italian Occupied Albanian Kingdom (1939–1943) ==
=== Queen Consort of Albania ===
Picture	Name	Father	Birth	Marriage	Became Consort	Ceased to be Consort	Death	Spouse
	Elena of Montenegro	Nicholas I of Montenegro (Petrović-Njegoš)	8 January 1873	24 October 1896	16 April 1939 (Husband claimed title)	3 September 1943 (Husband renounced title)	28 November 1952	Victor Emmanuel III

== See also ==
- List of Albanian monarchs
- King of Albania
- Regalia of Albania
