= Sazan =

Island in Albania

Native name: Ishulli i Sazanit
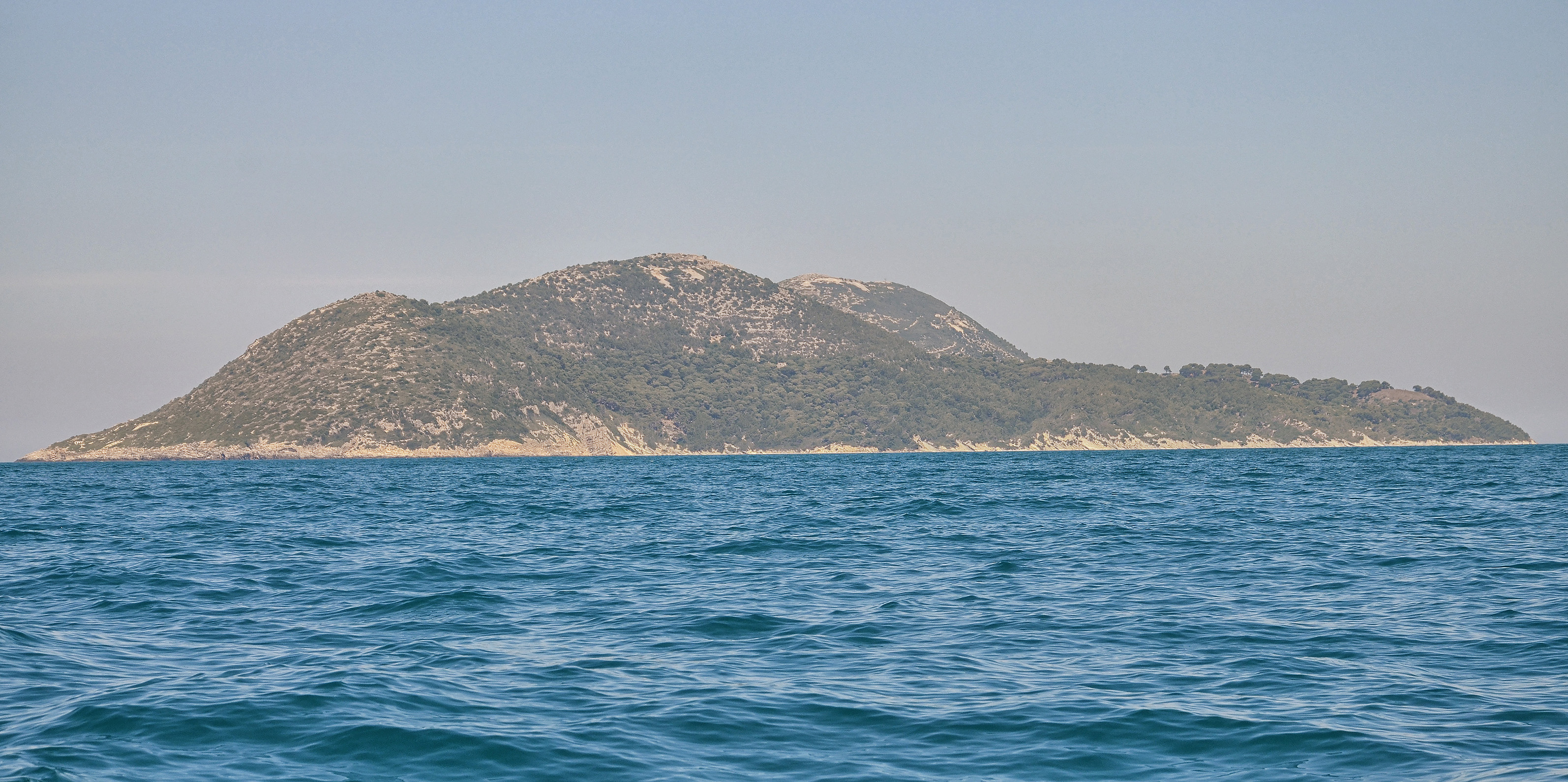
- Sazan seen from the Karaburun Peninsula

- Location within Albania

Geography
- Coordinates: 40°29′37″N 19°16′50″E
- Area: 5.7 km^{2} (2.2 sq mi)
- Length: 4.8 km (2.98 mi)
- Width: 2 km (1.2 mi)
- Highest elevation: 344 m (1129 ft)

Administration
- Albania
- State: Vlorë County
- Municipality: Vlorë
- Sazan Lighthouse
- Constructed: 1871 (first)
- Height: 11.9 m (39 ft)
- Shape: cylindrical tower attached to a 2-storey keeper's house
- Power source: solar power
- First lit: 1920s (current)
- Focal height: 157 m (515 ft)
- Range: 14 nmi (26 km; 16 mi)
- Characteristic: Fl(4) W 15s

Sazan (Albanian definite form: Ishulli i Sazanit) (Note: It is also known as Saseno, Sasnum, Saseni, Sasno, Sason, Suazi, and Saso.) is an Albanian island in the Adriatic Sea. The largest of Albania's islands, it is a designated military exclusion zone; it lies in a strategically important location between the Strait of Otranto and the mouth of the Bay of Vlorë, which marks the border between the Adriatic and Ionian seas.

In 2010, 2,721.87 hectares (6,725.9 acres) of the island's surrounding marine area was designated as the Karaburun-Sazan Marine Park. In clear weather, Sazan is sometimes visible from the coast of Salento, Italy, to its west. The island has been open to the public since July 2015. The island has a surface area of 5.7 km^{2} (2.2 sq mi). It is 4.8 km (3.0 mi) long and 2 km (1.2 mi) wide, and its coastline measures about 15 km (9.3 mi).

== History ==
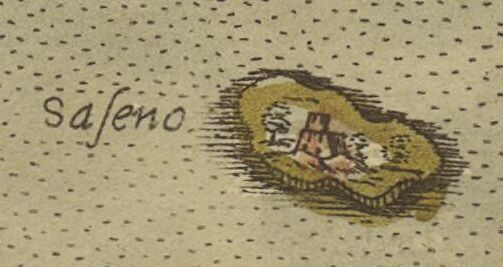
1571 depiction of Sazan Island with a fortified building

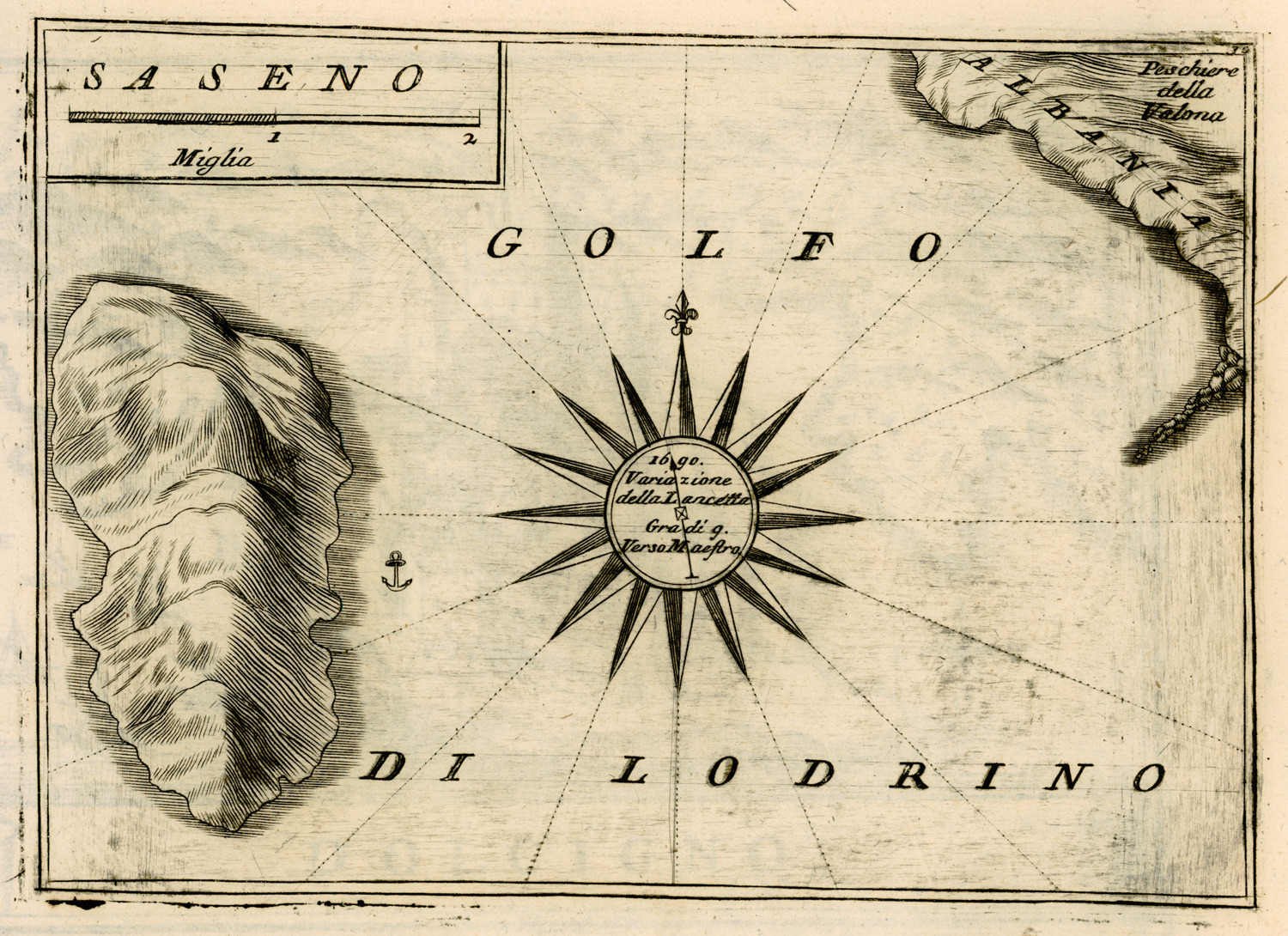
Map of Sazan Island in 1688

=== Antiquity ===
Sazan was known as Sason (Σάσων) to the ancient Greeks, and Saso to the ancient Romans. Pseudo-Scylax mentioned it in his Periplus.

Polybius wrote that Philip V's fleet anchored during his naval operations off Illyria, using it as a staging point while awaiting intelligence about Roman movements; however, after hearing false reports of a strong Roman naval force, he panicked and withdrew his entire fleet, abandoning the opportunity to strike at Apollonia and potentially gain control of Illyria while Rome was distracted by Hannibal.

The island was part of the Roman Empire, and later came under Byzantine rule.

=== Medieval period ===
In 1264, a naval clash known as the Battle of Sazan took place off the island, between the Republic of Genoa and the Republic of Venice.

In 1279, it was captured by the Kingdom of Albania, and in the 14th century, it was held by Albanian lords, often under the protection of the Republic of Venice.

In 1371–1372, following the seizure of Vlorë by the Balsha noble family, many inhabitants fled to the nearby Sazan Island, where they placed themselves under Venetian protection. Although the Balshas retained control of the surrounding mainland territories such as Vlorë and Kaninë, Venice effectively exercised practical control over Sazan. By the late 1380s, Comita Muzaka, widow of Balsha II, formally recognized Venetian dominion over the island by providing an annual tribute of rowers for the Venetian fleet, confirming Venice's legal authority there.

A contemporary record from 18 September 1372 in Ragusa documents a maritime incident involving the island of Sazan. Jurça, a sailor, appeared before the rector Ser Johannes de Grede to complain about Potrentinus, his brother Miralia, and Goico Stanče of Vlorë, who were then residing on Sazan Island. He reported that in June of the previous year, they had captured him along with two of his ships, seizing fifteen gold ducats, two swords, three shields, a bow with its string, a barrel of wine, and two sacks of cloth. They also detained him and his sailors for a full month. This event is documented in the "Lamento de foris 1370–1373."

By 1393, Sazan was securely acknowledged as under Venetian control, while Vlorë and Kaninë remained under Comita's authority. Following Comita's death, her daughter Rugjina Balsha's husband, Mrkša Žarković, ruled the Principality of Vlorë from 1396 to 1414, after which Rugjina Balsha herself ruled from 1414 to 1417. Eventually, the advancing Ottomans captured the region, and by 1418, Vlorë and the surrounding bay, including Sazan, fell under Ottoman control.

Before the establishment of Ottoman control, Sazan Island was an important maritime and religious site in the southern Adriatic Sea. The island hosted a Marian shrine, recorded in Italian sources as S. Maria della Suazi, and later identified with the Greek Orthodox chapel dedicated to the Virgin Mary. By the late 15th century, a second chapel dedicated to Saint Nicholas is also recorded on the island. These religious sites were part of a broader network of coastal shrines devoted to Mary and St Nicholas, including S. Maria de Casopoli in Corfu, and S. Maria de le Scanfarie in the Strofades Islands, reflecting the island's role as both a spiritual sanctuary and a navigational landmark. Sazan was located along a perilous stretch of the Adriatic Sea, where sailors faced dangerous currents, storms, and the risk of shipwreck, and its bays provided a sheltered anchorage. Monastic buildings on the island contributed to its reputation for holiness. Marian and St Nicholas shrines were frequently paired along Adriatic maritime routes, reflecting their role in protecting seafarers. Pilgrimage itineraries and liturgical sources, such as the Sante Parole, mention Sazan Island and indicate its importance as a religious site for travelers during the Late Middle Ages.

By the late 15th century, Sazan had become an important Ottoman naval base in the Adriatic Sea. A contemporary travel account by Arnold von Harff in 1497 described Sazan as a very fine harbour where the Ottomans regularly stationed ships. The island contained two small Greek Orthodox chapels, one dedicated to the Virgin Mary and the other to Saint Nicholas. It was also used by the Sultan to graze valuable horses. The Ottoman forces launched their 1480 expedition across the Adriatic Sea to Apulia and Calabria from Sazan, leading to the capture of Otranto.

In the early 16th century, the Ottoman admiral and cartographer Piri Reis, in his book Kitab-ı Bahriye, completed in 1521, described Sazan as a navigational landmark. He noted the presence of drinking water and a landing place on the eastern side of the island, as well as the ruins of a church; possibly the remains of the chapels mentioned by Arnold von Harff a few decades earlier. Piri Reis also advised anchoring in ten fathoms of water to avoid the rocky seabed, and warned of a submerged reef nearby.

By 1696, it had fallen back under Venetian suzerainty.

=== Modern era ===
After the end of the Napoleonic Wars in 1815, the island came under British control together with the Ionian Islands as part of the Treaty of Paris. In 1864, the island was ceded to Greece along with the Ionian Islands. But Greece did not occupy it, thus allowing it to remain under the de facto control of the Ottomans, until 1912 when Greek forces landed to officially occupy the island. The end of the First Balkan War in 1913 saw Italy take control of the island and establish a military post there. This was later ratified on 26 April 1915 by the secret Treaty of London. After World War I, Albania formally ceded the island to Italy on 2 September 1920 as part of the Albano-Italian protocol. The island was part of Italy from 1920 until after World War II, administratively part of Lagosta, in the province of Zara. In those years, the Italian authorities built a lighthouse and some naval fortifications, and populated the island with a few families of fishermen relocated from Apulia.

During World War II, Sazan was home to a base for German and Italian submarines. After the war, in 1947, the Paris Peace Treaty transferred sovereignty over the island to Albania.

=== Post–World War II ===
During the Cold War between the Soviet Union and the United States, Albania relied heavily on the Soviet Union. During that time, the Soviets built a base for Whiskey-class submarines and a chemical–biological weapons plant on the island and surrounding areas, and stationed around 3,000 military personnel there. However, the Soviet-Albanian split in the early 1960s marked the end of the Soviet naval presence on Sazan. After the fall of communism, four submarines remained at Pasha Limani port in the bay of Vlore. To this day, many Soviet-era gas masks can be found scattered around the valley of the island.

A 1950 US Army counter-intelligence survey described the island as dominating the entire Strait of Otranto, and noted its strategic value as a defense position for the entrance to Vlorë Bay.

The island is now uninhabited, but there is a small joint Italian—Albanian naval base, of reportedly two soldiers, used mainly to counter contraband between southern Italy and Albania, as a training field for the British Royal Navy, and as shelter for boats in nearby Albanian waters. There are approximately 3,600 nuclear bunkers that Albania built during the Cold War. There is also a villa on the island belonging to the former communist defence minister Beqir Balluku. In 2010, the surrounding sea waters of the island and those of the adjacent Karaburun Peninsula were designated a National Marine Park by the Albanian government.

==== 2020s ====
In 2024, construction of the Sazan Island Resort on the island as well as on several hundred hectares of the Vjosa-Narta protected landscape was proposed by Jared Kushner and his company, Affinity Partners, after Kushner visited the island with Ivanka Trump.

Since May 2026, in Zvërnec (on the mainland opposite), environmental protests known as the Flamingo Revolution erupted following approval of the resort by the Albanian government. Opponents of the development allege that construction in the nearby Pishë Poro–Narta protected area damages wetlands, dunes, and forested areas; however, Albanian authorities maintain that the works comply with permit and environmental regulations. The protests resulted in confrontations between protesters, private security personnel, and police.

== Environment ==
=== Geography and climate ===
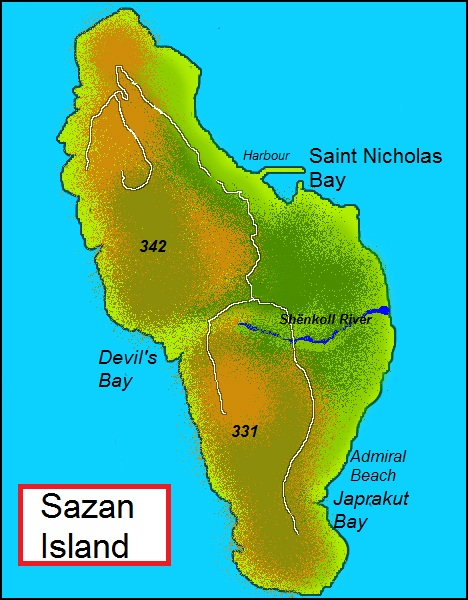
Map of Sazan Island

Sazan is the largest island in the country and Albania's westernmost point. It is strategically located at the entrance to the Bay of Vlorë, in the eastern Strait of Otranto separating Italy from Albania. It is also located at the informal boundary between the Adriatic Sea and Ionian Sea within the Mediterranean Sea, which is just to the south, according to international scientific bodies.

The island is composed of limestone rocks formed during the Cretaceous period, while the eastern part is partially composed of terrigenous and clastic deposits. It has four peaks, the highest standing at 344 m (1,129 ft) above sea level followed by two peaks in the center 331 m (1,086 ft) and 307 m (1,007 ft), and the lowest with 228 m (748 ft) in the south of the island. Sazan has a coastline of about 15 km (9.3 mi) characterized by sandy beaches, capes, rocky cliffs, and underwater fauna.

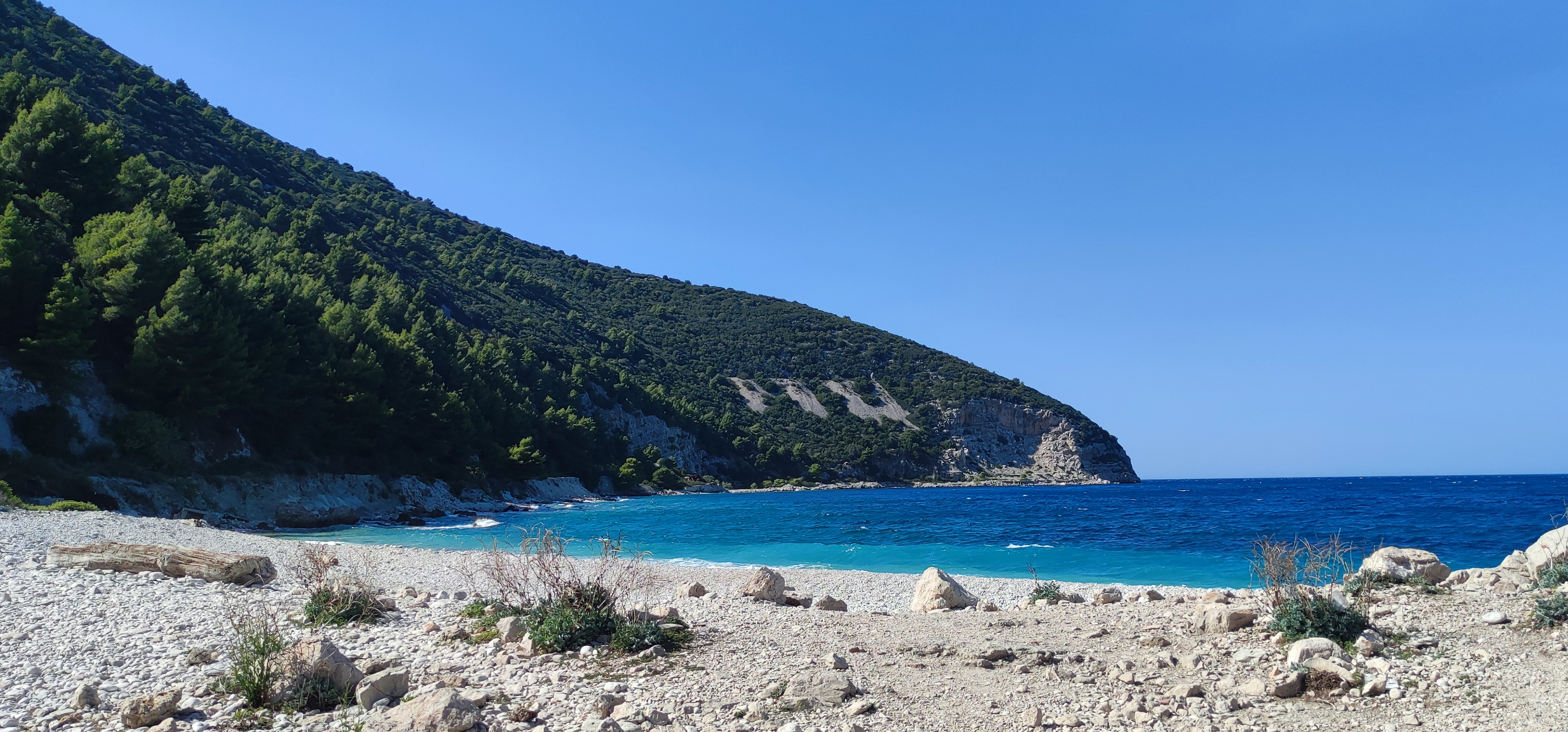
Bay of St. Nicholas

Along its western shore, the cliffs descend up to 40 m (0.025 mi) underwater. Capes of the island include the Bay of Paradise (Gjiri i Parajsës), Bay of St. Nicholas (Gjiri i Shënkollit), Cape of Shënkoll, Cape of Kallam, Cape of Jug, Cape of Pëllumba, and Cape of Pulbardha.

A small tornado or waterspout was spotted along the coast coming inland in August 2002.

Climate data for Sazan (1991–2010)
Month	Jan	Feb	Mar	Apr	May	Jun	Jul	Aug	Sep	Oct	Nov	Dec	Year
Mean daily maximum °C (°F)	16.3 (61.3)	17.5 (63.5)	18.6 (65.5)	20.1 (68.2)	22.9 (73.2)	25.6 (78.1)	28.4 (83.1)	28.4 (83.1)	25.8 (78.4)	23.4 (74.1)	19.6 (67.3)	17.4 (63.3)	22.0 (71.6)
Mean daily minimum °C (°F)	10.2 (50.4)	10.5 (50.9)	11.7 (53.1)	13.3 (55.9)	16.4 (61.5)	21.3 (70.3)	23.7 (74.7)	23.4 (74.1)	21.2 (70.2)	16.5 (61.7)	13.1 (55.6)	11.1 (52.0)	16.0 (60.9)
Average precipitation days	10	9	7	6	4	3	1	2	4	7	10	11	74
Source: METEOALB Weather Station

=== Flora and fauna ===
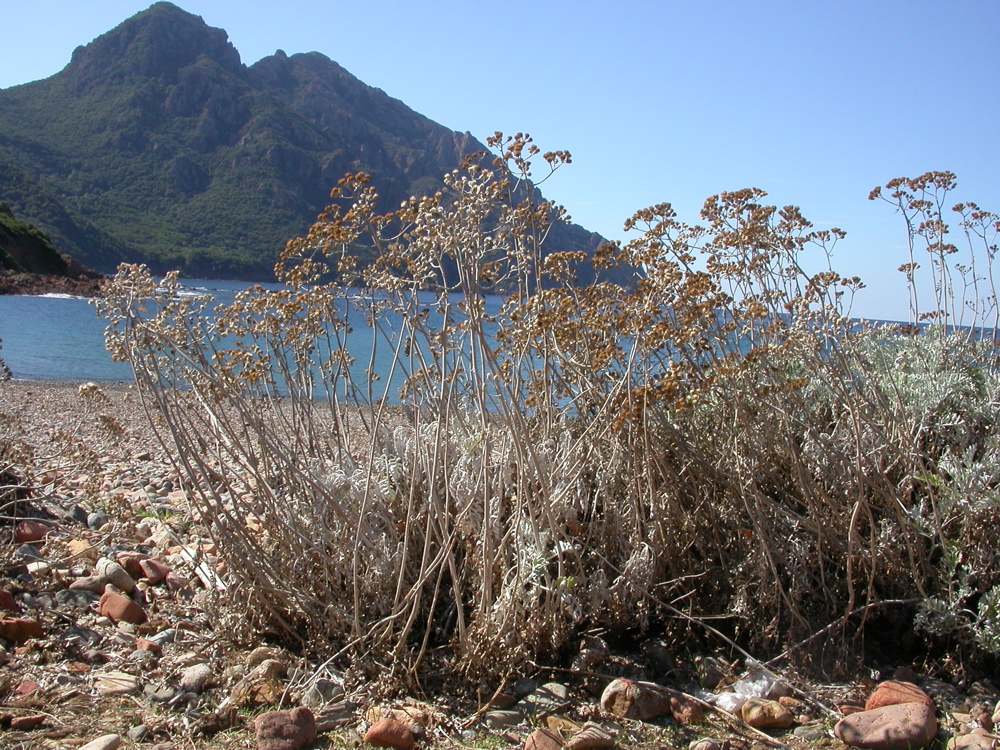
Jacobaea maritima can be found on the eastern coast.

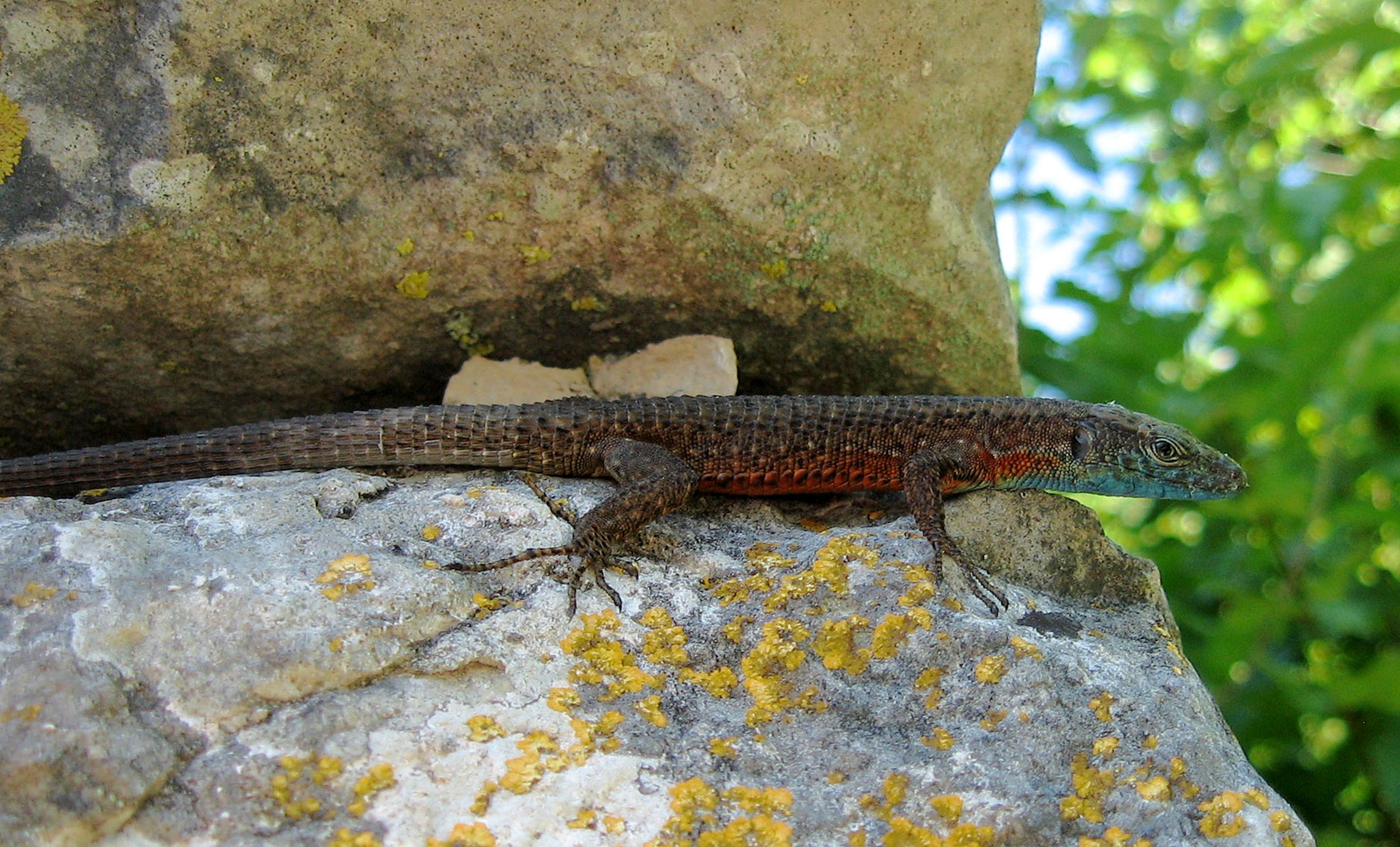
The Dalmatian algyroides is the most remarkable reptile on Sazan.

Biogeographically, Sazan Island falls within the Illyrian deciduous forests terrestrial ecoregion of the Palearctic Mediterranean forests, woodlands, and scrub. Due to the combination of southern latitude and high altitude, as well as variations in climate, geological and hydrological conditions have contributed to the formation of a unique flora on the island.

The variety of flora and vegetation can be explained by its strategic position between the western and eastern Mediterranean Sea. The island is home to 435 species (419 indigenous) of vascular plants, or 8.2% of Albania's entire vascular flora. Of these, one species is endemic (Limonium anfractum) and three are subendemic (Centaurea pawlowski, Scutellaria rupestris, and Verbascum guicciardini). The varied relief creates various ecological environments for plants, further diversified by the dominant rock types, which form siliceous and calcareous terrain on the territory of the park. The rocky shores and limestone sea cliffs on the southern corners of Sazan are home to numerous halophile species such as Lotus cytisoides and Limonium anfractum. The forests of Sazan are generally composed of shrubs, sclerophyll forests with holm oak, deciduous forests with hophornbeam and south European flowering ash.

Due to its specific topographic, climatic, hydrological, and geological conditions, the island has unique vegetation and biodiversity. The fauna is represented by 15 species of mammals (including 8 species of bats such as the common pipistrelle, and soprano pipistrelle), 39 species of birds, 8 species of reptiles, 1 species of amphibian, and 122 species of invertebrates. The bird species in Sazan with high conservation value include 23 songbirds, 5 birds of prey, 3 pigeons, and 3 swifts.

The amphibians represented include the green toad, which nests in wet deciduous forests and forest streams. There are eight reptile species. The Mediterranean house gecko, Hermann's tortoise, Balkan pond turtle, sheltopusik, blue-throated keeled lizard, Balkan wall lizard, Montpellier snake, and Balkan whip snake are present in most rocky and wet natural habitats on the island.

There are 122 identified species, including 113 insects, but their actual number is estimated to be higher. Among the insects 40 are beetles, 16 butterflies, 22 heteroptera, 20 orthoptera, five dragonflies, and 10 hymenoptera.

== See also ==
- Albanian Adriatic and Ionian Sea Coast
- Geography of Albania
- Sazan Island Resort

== Bibliography ==
- Bacci, Michele (2017). Marian Cult-sites along the Venetian sea-routes to Holy Land in the Late Middle Ages. University of Salento.
- Elsie, Robert (2003). Early Albania A Reader of Historical Texts, 11th–17th Centuries. Harrassowitz. ISBN 978-3-4470-4783-8.
- Miller, William (2014). Essays on the Latin Orient. Cambridge University Press. ISBN 978-1-1074-5553-5.
- Sufflay, Emil von; Jireček, Konstantin; Thallóczy, Lajos (1918). Acta et diplomata res Albaniae mediae aetatis illustrantia [Acts and documents illustrating the affairs of medieval Albania] (in Latin). Vol. 2. typis A. Holzhausen.
