= Muzaka-Serbian Conflict =

Conflict during the Middle ages

- Part of the aftermath of the Byzantine civil war of 1341–1347 and Fall of the Serbian Empire
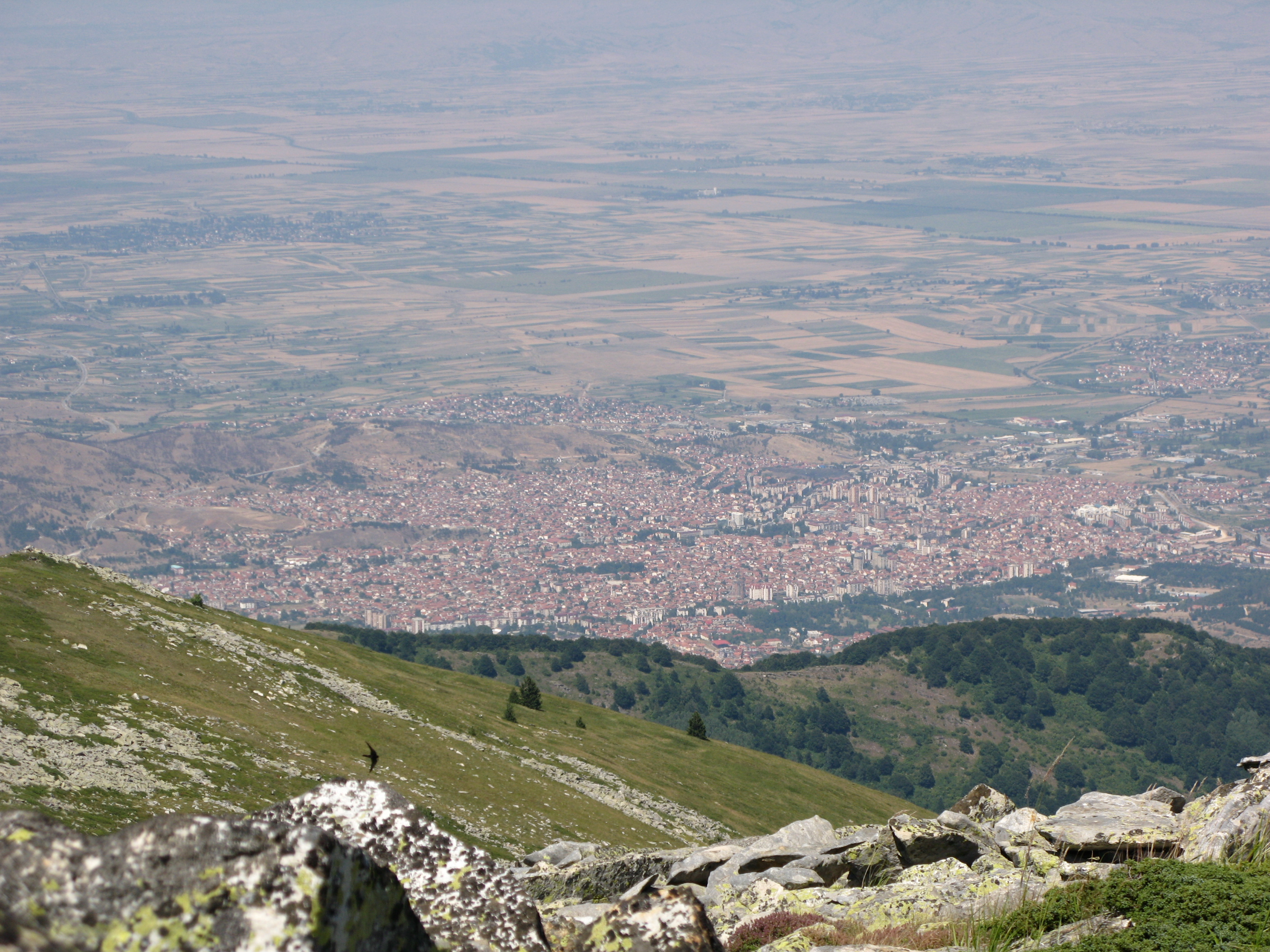
- Pelister mountain where forces of Andrea Muzaka defeated the Serbian army in 1369-1370 and 1370-1372.
Date	1350–1370
Location	Albania
Result	Albanian victory
Territorial changes	Muzaka forces capture Myzeqe, Berat, Tomorricë, Skrapar, Këlcyrë, Përmet, Opar, Devoll, Kolonjë and Kastoria.

Belligerents
Principality of Muzaka; Support: Byzantine Empire; Gropa family Angevins; Balšić family	Serbian Empire; Principality of Valona; Despotate of Epirus

Commanders and leaders
Andrea II Muzaka; Balša II; Andrea Gropa	Stefan Dušan # King Vukašin (POW); Prince Marko; John Komnenos Asen; Alexander Komnenos Asen; Thomas Preljubović

Strength
Unknown	Unknown

Casualties and losses
Unknown	Unknown

The Muzaka-Serbian Conflict was a series of armed engagements and battles throughout the Middle Ages fought by the Albanian Principality of Muzaka against the Serbian Empire, during a span of around 20 years.

== Background ==
Conflicts between the Albanian principalities and medieval Serbia started some time after the weakening of the Byzantine Empire and the Bulgarian Empire in the middle and late 13th century. In the late 13th century, the forces of the Serbian Kingdom led by Stefan Milutin would invade Northern Albania with the goal of taking the Mat-Dibër line. In 1296, Milutins forced would capture Durrës, however they would fail to capture Dibër after being defeated in battle by Albanian noble Progonos Sgouros somewhere between modern-day Ohrid and Tetovo. In the peace treaty in 1299, all of Northern Albania would be ceded to the Kingdom of Serbia.

It is reported that a revolt was held in 1318 by Albanian nobles, led by the Muzaka family which was incited by Philip I of Taranto and Pope John XXII, however the revolt would easily be suppressed.

Serbian campaigns in Albania would continue during the rule of Stefan Dušan who would invade Southern Albania, capturing Vlorë and Kanina as well as taking Berat from the Muzaka principality. The dominions of the Serbian Empire would stretch south to include Epirus and Thessaly. It is not clear if the Serbian Empire had achieved total control over the southern Albanian noble families or just small submissions.

== Events ==
During the Serbian occupation of Albania under Stefan Dušan, one of the most notable resistances was that of the Muzaka Principality led by Andrea II Muzaka. The Muzaka forces besieged and eventually captured the city of Berat in 1350, forcing the Serbian governor of the lands between Berat and Vlora, John Komnenos Asen, to retreat to Kanina. Around the same time Andrea II Muzaka was able to capture the plains of Myzeqe from the Serbian forces. The name of the land derives from the battle, with "Myzeqe" meaning "Vendi i Muzakajve" (Land of the Muzaka). During the conflict the Muzaka forces also had support from the Anjou, with whom they allied in 1336, with a compromise of the Anjou capturing Durrës.

After the death of Stefan Dušan and the fall of the Serbian Empire in 1355, Serbian rule in Albania weakened, leading to Andrea II defeating the Serbian forces and capturing Korça and Devoll.

Sometime after 1363, after the death of John Komnenos Asen, Andrea Muzaka defeated the Serbian forces led by John's son, Despot Alexander Komnenos Asen, capturing Vlorë and Kaninë.

With help from the Balšić family, in 1369 or 1370 the Principality of Muzaka defeated the Serbian army under King Vukašin in Pelister, capturing the Serbian noble as a Prisoner of War. In this time period the Muzaka would also capture Kastoria from Thomas Preljubović who had received the city after the death of Simeon Uroš in 1370.

Between 1370 and 1372, with help from Albanian nobility, the Muzaka forces once again defeated the Serbian army led by Vukašin's son Prince Marko in Pelister.

== Aftermath ==
After the conflict between the Muzaka and the Serbian Empire ended, the Muzaka's had captured most of southern Albania, including much of Myzeqe, Berat, Tomorricë, Skrapar, Këlcyrë, Përmet, Opar, Devoll, Kolonjë and Kastoria. For his contribution and victories against the Serbian Empire, he would be named as Despot of Epirus by Byzantine emperor John V Palaiologos

== See also ==
- Albanian-Anjou Conflict
- Byzantine civil war of 1341–1347
- Battle of Achelous (1359)
