= Balša =

Balša (Serbian: Балша, transl. Balsha) is a Montenegrin name and may refer to:

- Balša Božović (politician), Serbian politician of Montenegrin origin
- Balša Brković, Montenegrin writer
- Balša Popović (born 2000), Montenegrin footballer
- Balša Radunović, Montenegrin basketballer
- Balša Rajčević, Serbian artist of Montenegrin descent
- House of Balšić, Montenegrin dynasty ruling Zeta
  - Balša I
  - Balša II
  - Balša III
- Balša Hercegović, medieval nobleman
- Balsha is a village in the capital region of Bulgaria.
