= Thopia expansionist Wars =

Series of military campaigns during 1358-1385

- Part of the Middle Ages
Date	1358–1385
Location	Albania
Result	Thopia victory: Fall of Anjou rule in Albania.
Territorial changes	Most of Central Albania is captured by the Thopia.

Belligerents
Principality of Albania; Support: Ottoman Empire	Anjou; Principality of Zeta; Muzaka Principality; Mataranga family

Commanders and leaders
Karl Thopia; Support: Hayreddin Pasha	Joanna I of Naples; Louis of Évreux; Balša II †; George Strez Balšić (POW); Andrea II Muzaka; Vlashë Mataranga

The Thopia expansionist Wars were a series of military campaigns by the Thopia dynasty led by Karl Thopia against neighbouring states during the years of 1358–1385. During these years, the Thopia regularly engaged with the Anjou, who were in control of the city of Durrës, and with the Balshaj, who were also expanding their territory in Albania.

== Background ==
After the death of Stefan Dušan in 1355, Serbian rule in Albania weakened. Most of Southern Albania was captured by the Principality of Muzaka, while in Central Albania, in the beginning of 1358, the Thopia rebelled against Stefan Uroš II and captured most of the region. In the spring of 1358, Karl Thopia also defeated Nikephoros II Orsini in the Battle of Achelous.

== Campaigns ==
The campaigns of the Principality of Albania against neighbouring states began in the rule of Karl Thopia on 1358, with his revolt against the Anjou who controlled most of medieval Albania and Epirus. The revolt ultimately led to the Thopia driving the Anjou out of the city of Durrës and forming the Principality of Albania.

The Anjou were the able to reclaim the city before it was besieged by the Albanians in 1362. The siege lasted from April-May 1362, with Karl Thopia having to withdraw after an epidemic spread in his army, however Durrës was besieged again in 1368 and the Thopia captured the city which at that point had become one of the most important cities of the Anjou, due to their loss of land on other fronts. After the defeat in Durrës, dutchess of the Anjou, Joanna of Naples and her husband Louis I of Naples began forming plans to recapture their lost lands in Albania including Durrës and much of the land of the Principality of Albania. To initiate such an expedition, they gathered the support of Charles II of Navarre. Before the expedition took place, during the end of the 1360's, Karl Thopia was attacked in the south by the Principality of Muzaka led by Andrea II Muzaka together with Vlashë Mataranga. The two forces engaged in the Castle of Bregu near the Shkumbin River, capturing the lands of Gosa and Garunja.

In the year of 1363, the Thopia began fighting with the Balshaj led by Balša II for the control of Lake Skadar and Durrës. In 1364, allied with the Mataruge tribe, Balša II began a campaign in Albania, hoping to invade the lands of the Principality of Albania, however they were defeated in battle and George Strez Balšić was captured as a prisoner of war. George would not be released until 1366, when the Republic of Ragusa mediated peace between the Thopia and the Balšići.

After 1372, with the death of Andrea II Muzaka, Karl Thopia led a campaign against the weakened Muzaka Principality which was divided by Andrea's sons. The Thopias recaptured Gosa and Garunja and crossed the Shkumbin river into Southern Albania capturing Muzaka land there as well. During this time Karl Thopia also invaded the dominions of the Mataranga family.

In the year of 1376, the Navarrese led by Louis of Naples set of on an expedition in Durrës, besieging the city. The siege began in midsummer and led to the Anjou capturing Durrës and reestablishing the Kingdom of Albania. After the death of Louis I of Naples the same year as the expedition, the city remained under the control of Joanna and her second husband Robert IV of Artois. In 1383 Karl Thopia besieged Durrës again, capturing the city. The defeat in the Siege of Durrës of 1383 ultimately led to the fall of the Angevin Kingdom of Albania, and after siege the Anjou never attempted to recapture their lost land in Albania again, bringing an end to the Albanian-Anjou Conflict.

In the year of 1385, Balša II attacked Durrës taking it from the Thopia. To recapture the city, Karl Thopia created an alliance with the Ottoman Empire. On 18 September 1385, an Ottoman-Thopia force consisting of 40,000 troops led by Karl Thopia and Hayreddin Pasha attacked the Balšići force led by Balša II and Ivaniš Mrnjavčević in the Savra field near modern-day Lushnjë. After a short battle the Ottoman-Thopia forces would emerge victorious with both Balša II and Ivaniš Mrnjavčević being killed in battle. After the Battle of Savra, the Thopia forces once again captured Durrës.

== Aftermath ==
The Battle of Savra began Ottoman incursions in Albania and its surroundings. During 1389, the Ottomans led by Sultan Murad I set off on a campaign in Serbia where they were engaged in Kosovo by a joint Balkanic army led by the Serbian prince Lazar. After tense fighting neither side was able to claim victory, with both Murad and Lazar falling in battle.

== Sources ==
- Fine, John V. A. (1994). The Late Medieval Balkans: A Critical Survey from the Late Twelfth Century to the Ottoman Conquest. University of Michigan Press. ISBN 0-472-08260-4.
