= Stracimir Balšić =

Member of the Balšić noble family

Stracimir Balšić Strazimir Balsha
- Lord of Zeta
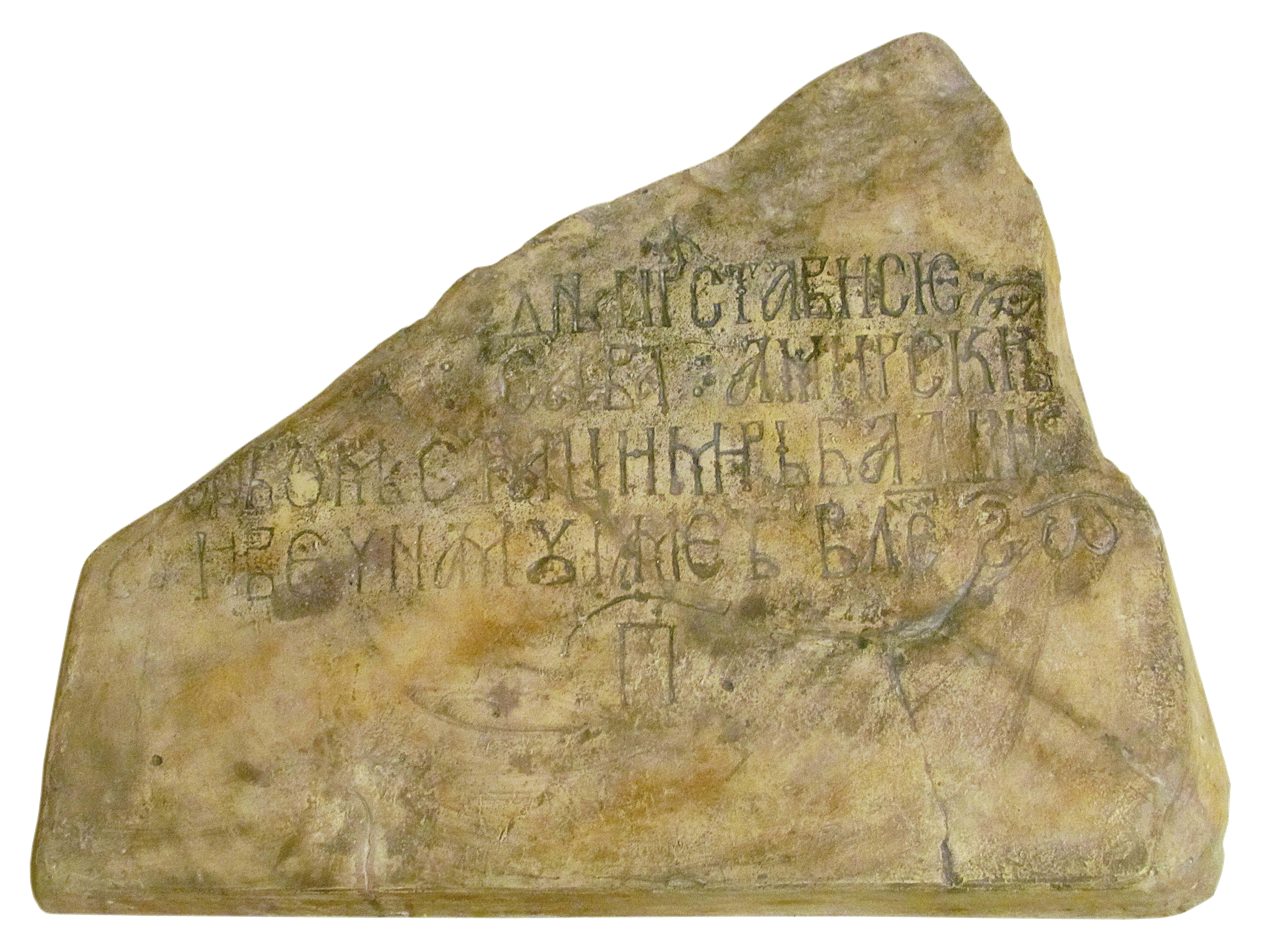
- Grave inscription of Stracimir found in the Monastery of the Holy Archangels, Prizren
- Died: 15 January 1373
- Spouse: Irene Duklina; Milica Mrnjavčević
- Issue: Đurađ II Balšić; Gojko; Ivaniš
- House: Balšić
- Father: Balša I

Stracimir Balšić (Serbian Cyrillic: Страцимир Балшић; Albanian: Strazimir Balsha) or Strazimir Balsha fl. 1360 – 15 January 1373) was a Lord of Zeta, alongside his two brothers Đurađ I and Balša II, in ca. 1362–1372. The Balšić family took over Zeta, by 1362, during the fall of the Serbian Empire. Stracimir took monastic vows and died in 1372. He left three sons, one of whom later became the Lord of Zeta (Đurađ II).

== Life ==
Stracimir was the eldest son of Balša I (his two brothers were Balša II and Đurađ I), a petty nobleman who held only one village during the rule of Serbian Emperor Stephen Dušan the Mighty (r. 1331–1355). Some years after the death of the Emperor, Balša I and his sons managed to expand their local power, beginning by taking lands previously held by Lord Žarko (south of Lake Skadar, Lower Zeta). In 1361, during a conflict between the Republic of Ragusa and Vojislav Vojinović, they supported Ragusa. For this, they became Ragusan citizens in May or 3 July 1361. In 1362, the three brothers killed čelnik Đuraš Ilijić, and expanded further into Upper Zeta. Their father died the same year. The brothers succeeded their father ruling Zeta together, though Đurađ I was the major figure. They were called "oblastni gospodari" ("provincial lords") in charters of Emperor Uroš V the Weak (r. 1355–1371). In 1368, after Đurađ I's attack on Kotor, the Serbian court deemed him a rebel. The brothers converted from Serbian Orthodoxy to Roman Catholicism in 1368–1369, in order to further their coastal ambitions.

== Monastic life and death ==
Death inscription

The monk Sava presented himself, and in the world he was called Stracimir Balšić and may his memory live forever in the summer of 1372.

Towards the end of his life, Stracimir became tonsured as an Eastern Orthodox monk at Monastery of the Holy Archangels in Prizren. This is confirmed by a stone inscription for the memory of his death at the south wall of the church next to his tombstone in Church Slavonic which refers to his monastic name as Sava.

== Family ==
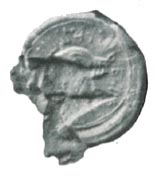
Seal of the Balsha brothers.

Stracimir married firstly Irene Duklina, and secondly Milica Mrnjavčević, the daughter of Serbian King Vukašin Mrnjavčević. He had three sons with Milica:

- Đurađ II (1385–1403), married Jelena Lazarević
- Gojko (died before 1372)
- Ivaniš (died before 1372)

Stracimir became a monk and was tonsured before his death on 15 January 1372, and the power was now shared by Đurađ I, Balša II, and Stracimir's son Đurađ II, who each held an individual appanage.
