= Battle of Savra =

1385 battle between Ottoman and Zetan forces in modern-day Albania

Coordinates: 40°54′N 19°41′E

Battle of Savra Beteja e Savrës
- Part of the Ottoman wars in Europe and the Thopia expansionist Wars
Date	18 September 1385
Location	Savran field, near Lushnjë
Result	Thopia-Ottoman victory

Belligerents
Principality of Thopia; Ottoman Empire	Principality of Zeta

Commanders and leaders
Karl Thopia (Ottoman Empire) Halil Pasha	Balša II †; Ivaniš Mrnjavčević †

Strength
40,000	1,000 men according to Mavro Orbini

The Battle of Savra (Albanian: Beteja e Savrës; Serbian: Bitka na Saurskom polju; Turkish: Savra Muharebesi; "Battle on the Saurian field") or the Battle of the Vjosë was fought on 18 September 1385 between Ottoman and much smaller Zetan forces, at the Savra field near Lushnjë (in modern-day southern Albania). The Ottomans were invited by Karl Thopia to support him in his feud against Balša II.

== Background ==
In 1372, Balša II married Comita Muzaka, a daughter of Andrea II Muzaka. As a dowry, Balša II gained Vlorë, Berat, Kaninë and Himarë which constituted the Principality of Vlorë. This arrangement, made after the death of Alexander Komnenos Asen in 1371, also ensured Balša's support against mutual enemies like Marko. It's unclear whether Muzaka had already conquered the cities or if Balša was planning to take them, but the agreement solidified Balša's claim to the territories through marriage. By 1383 or 1385, Balša II had conquered Durrës, presumably from Karl Thopia and in a charter issued to Ragusa during this period, he referred to himself as "Duke of Durrës". The expansion of Balša's realm into Epirus brought him to the frontline against the Ottomans. Aware of Ottoman aspirations to his territory, on 8 August 1385 Balša II asked the Venetians to support him with four galleys.

== Battle ==
Karl Thopia invited the Ottomans to support him in his conflict with Balša II. Thopia's invitation was accepted and Hayreddin Pasha brought his forces from the region of Ohrid (modern-day Macedonia) to Saurian field, near Lushnjë. News about the incursion of the Ottoman forces into the region of Berat reached Balša II while he was in Durrës. According to Mavro Orbini, Balša II rounded up 1,000 men in Durrës and, ignoring the advice of his nobles, headed out to take on the Ottoman raiders. Unsurprisingly, Balša's small forces had little success and Balša II was killed. Orbini's work is the only source that mentions Ivaniš Mrnjavčević as participating in this battle. Some scholars believe he did not even exist, while others believe that he was not an independent medieval lord, but a loyal member of the Balša family. Another person mentioned only by Orbini is Balša's voivode Đurađ Krvavčić, described as a brave warrior who also died in this battle. Mavrini explains that the body of Balša II was decapitated and his head taken to Hayreddin Pasha.

== Aftermath ==
Since the Ottomans were victorious, most of the local Serbian and Albanian lords became their vassals. Immediately after this battle Thopia recaptured Durrës, probably under the Ottoman suzerainty. The Ottomans captured Krujë, Berat, and Ulcinj but soon retreated from them, keeping only Kastoria under their permanent control.

The work of Mavro Orbini (The Realm of the Slavs) is one of the main primary sources about this battle. It contains many incorrect and imprecise data. Another primary source about the Battle of Savra is Marin Barleti who says that Balša II was brave and idealistic.

This battle set the foundation for centuries-long Ottoman presence in this part of the Balkans. Serbian historian Stojan Novaković emphasized that the battle's importance for these Serbian and Albanian lords was comparable to that of the Battle of Marica and Battle of Kosovo put together. The important result of this battle was the influx of Albanians into Ottoman forces who remained a significant source of its strength during the next 527 years.

== Sources ==
- Fine, John V. A. (1994). The Late Medieval Balkans: A Critical Survey from the Late Twelfth Century to the Ottoman Conquest. University of Michigan Press. ISBN 0-472-08260-4.
- Ivić, Aleksa; Mrđenović, Dušan; Spasić, Dušan; Palavestra, Aleksandar (1987). Rodoslovne tablice i grbovi srpskih dinastija i vlastele. Nova knj.
- Kiel, Machiel (1990). Ottoman architecture in Albania, 1385-1912. Research Centre for Islamic History, Art and Culture. ISBN 978-92-9063-330-3.
- Orbini, Mauro (1601). Il Regno de gli Slavi hoggi corrottamente detti Schiavoni. Pesaro: Apresso Girolamo Concordia.
- Орбин, Мавро (1968). Краљевство Словена. Београд: Српска књижевна задруга.
