= Žarković =

Žarković (Cyrillic: Жарковић) is a Serbo-Croatian surname, a patronymic derived from the given name Žarko. Notable people with the surname include:

- Dragan Žarković (born 1986), Serbian footballer
- Mrkša Žarković (1363–1414), Serbian nobleman
- Vidoje Žarković (1927–2000), Montenegrin politician
