= Comita Muzaka =

Medieval Albanian noblewoman of the Muzaka family

Comita Muzaka Komita Muzaka
- Princess of Zeta; Lady of Vlorë, Berat, Kaninë and Himarë
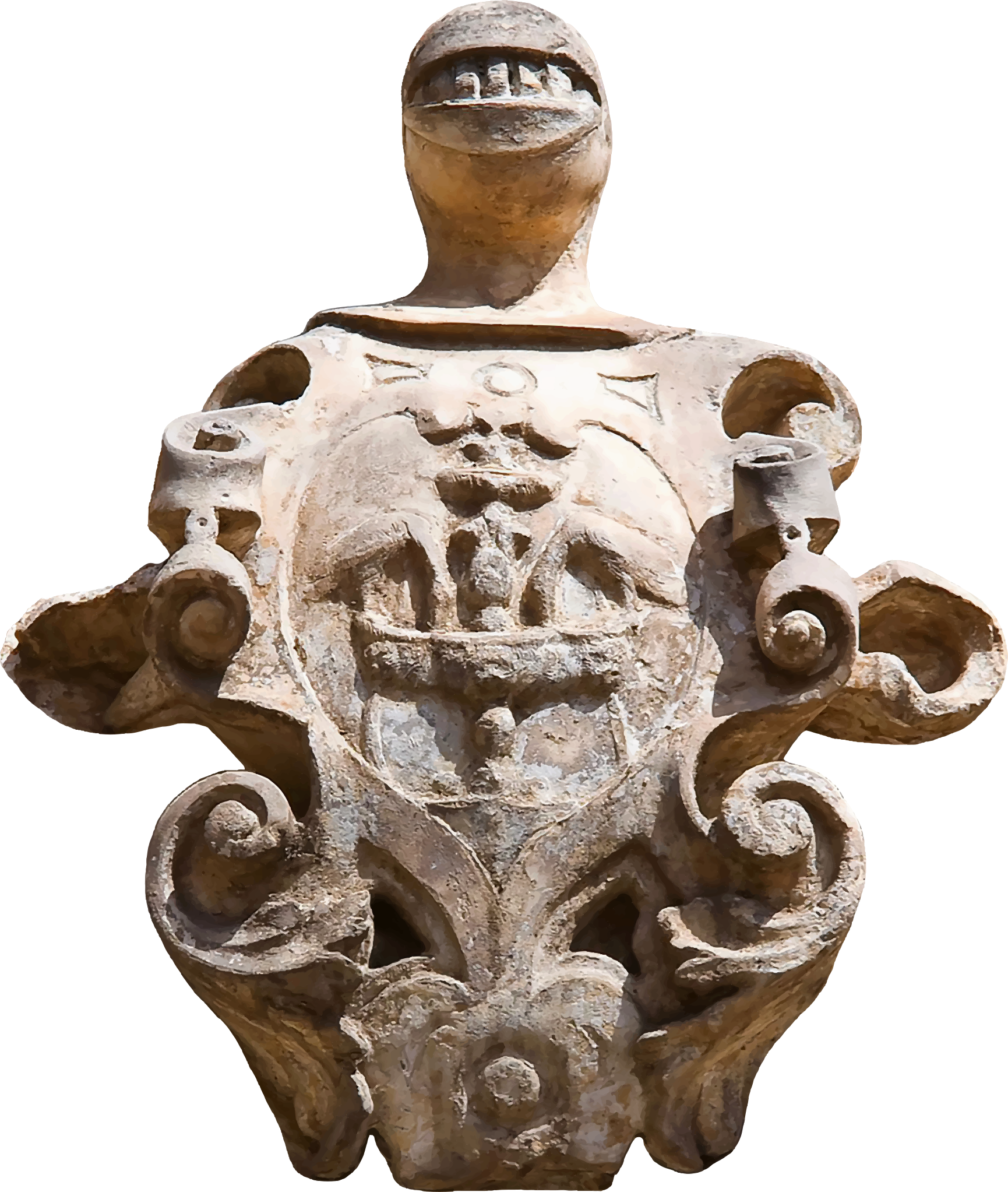
- Coat of Arms of the Muzaka family

Princess Consort of Zeta
- Reign: 1378-1385

Lady of Vlorë, Berat, Kaninë and Himarë
- Reign: 1385-1396
- Predecessor: Balsha II
- Successor: Mrkša Žarković
- Born: 14th century
- Died: 1396; Berat, Principality of Vlorë
- Spouse: Balsha II (m. 1372; died 1385)
- Issue: Rugjina Balsha
- House: Muzaka
- Father: Andrea II Muzaka
- Mother: Euphemia Mataranga
- Religion: Eastern Orthodox

Comita Muzaka (Albanian: Komita Muzaka died 1396), also known as Komnina, Komnena, Comnina or Komnene was an Albanian princess and member of the Muzaka family. She was a regnant Lady of Vlorë, Berat, Kaninë and Himarë between 1385 and 1396 as successor to her spouse.

== Life ==
Comita was the daughter of Andrea II Muzaka, who held the titles of Despot of Albania and Epirus, as well as Sebastokrator, from the noble Muzaka family. Her mother was Euphemia Mataranga, from the noble Mataranga family. She was the fourth youngest of five siblings, yet the eldest of the two daughters. Little is known about her early life.

She was married to Balsha II of the noble Balsha family in 1372. Andrea II Muzaka granted Balsha II control of Vlorë and Kaninë as part of a dowry following Balsha's marriage to Comita. This arrangement, made after the death of Alexander Komnenos Asen in 1371, also ensured Balsha's support against mutual enemies like Marko. It's unclear whether Muzaka had already conquered the cities or if Balsha was planning to take them, but the agreement solidified Balsha's claim to the territories through marriage.

=== Reign and Death ===
Her husband, Balsha II, was killed at the Battle of Savra in 1385. She subsequently assumed control of the Principality of Vlorë, becoming its primary ruler, and she ruled from Berat until she died in 1396.

Her daughter Rugjina Balsha married Mrkša Žarković in 1391 and he reigned the Principality of Vlorë in the right of his wife until his death in 1414. Rugjina then ruled from 1414 to 1417 until the Ottomans took control of the territory, where she then fled and took refuge in Corfu.

==== Conflict over the Devoll tower ====
In 1389, a tower known as Devoll Tower (or Pirgo, turris de Dievali) is mentioned in historical records, situated at the mouth of the Devoll River, with a customs office. The tower was initially tied to the conflict between Comita Muzaka of Vlorë and her nephew Nicola Muzaka. At the time, following the death of Teodor II Muzaka in 1389, the rule of his domain passed to his nephew, Teodor III Muzaka, instead of his son Nicola, likely because Nicola had either died or was held captive by his aunt, Comita. When Nicola was captured during the war with Comita, his men refused to surrender the tower until his release, leading both parties to temporarily hand it over to the Venetian Bailo of Corfu. After Nicola’s release in 1390, the Venetians returned the tower to Comita, but as a Venetian fief, requiring her to send three sailors annually to the Venetian fleet in Corfu. The tower was later captured by the Ottomans in 1417.

== Family ==
Comita Muzaka married Balsha II. The couple had one child:

- Rugjina Balsha married Mrkša Žarković in 1391. She ruled the Principality of Vlorë from 1414 to 1417.

== See also ==
- Muzaka family
- Balsha family
- Principality of Vlorë

== Bibliography ==
- Duka, Ferit (2004). Muzakajt - Lidhëz e Fuqishme Midis Kohëve Paraosmane dhe Osmane [The Muzakas – A Powerful Link Between the Pre-Ottoman and the Ottoman Time] (in Albanian). Qendra e Studimeve Albanologjike.
- Djukanovic, Bojka (2023). Historical Dictionary of Montenegro. Rowman & Littlefield Publishers. ISBN 978-1-5381-3915-8.
- Elsie, Robert (2003). Early Albania A Reader of Historical Texts, 11th-17th Centuries. Harrassowitz. ISBN 978-3-4470-4783-8.
- Fine, John V. A. (1994). The Late Medieval Balkans: A Critical Survey from the Late Twelfth Century to the Ottoman Conquest. University of Michigan Press. ISBN 978-0-4720-8260-5.
- Jacques, Edwin E. (2009). The Albanians: An Ethnic History from Prehistoric Times to the Present - Volume 1. McFarland & Company. ISBN 978-0-8995-0932-7.
- Miller, William (1921). Essays on the Latin Orient. Cambridge, University Press. ISBN 978-1-1074-5553-5.
- Noli, Fan Stylian (1921). Historia e Skënderbeut Gjerg Kastriotit, Mbretit te Shqiperise, 1412-1468 [The story of Skanderbeg Gjerg Kastriot, King of Albania,1412-1468] (in Albanian). Shtypeshkrinja e "Diellit,".
- Qeriqi, Ahmet (2023). The Stone of the Oath. novum pro Verlag. ISBN 978-1-6426-8417-9.
- Soulis, George Christos (1984). The Serbs and Byzantium During the Reign of Tsar Stephen Dušan (1331-1355) and His Successors. Dumbarton Oaks Library and Collection. ISBN 978-0-8840-2137-7.
- Veselinović, Andrija; Ljušić, Radoš (2002). Rodoslovi srpskih dinastija [Genealogies of Serbian dynasties] (in Serbian). Platoneum. ISBN 978-8-6836-3902-1.
