= Principality of Valona =

Medieval principality in Albania (1346–1417)

Principality of Valona and Kanina Principata e Vlorës dhe Kanina (Albanian)
- 1346–1417
- Principality of Vlorë in 1410
- Status: Principality, vassal of the Serbian Empire (1346–1355), Independent (1355–1417)
- Capital: Valona (Vlorë, Albania)
- Common languages: Albanian, Bulgarian, Greek, Serbian
- Religion: Eastern Orthodoxy Roman Catholicism
- Government: Principality
- Despot, later simply Lord
  - 1346–1363: John Komnenos Asen
  - 1363–1372: Alexander Komnenos Asen
  - 1372–1385: Balsha II
  - 1385–1396: Comita Muzaka
  - 1396–1414: Mrkša Žarković
  - 1414–1417: Rugjina Balsha
- Historical era: Medieval
  - Serbian conquest: 1346
  - De facto independence: 1355
  - Ottoman conquest: 1417
Preceded by	Succeeded by
Byzantine Empire	Sanjak of Avlona
- Today part of: Albania

The Principality of Valona and Kanina, (Note: Albanian: Principata e Vlorës dhe Kanina, Serbian: Кнежевина Валона и Канина, romanized: Kneževina Valona i Kanina, Bulgarian: Княжество, romanized: Knyazhestvo Vlora i Kanina) also known as the Despotate of Valona and Kanina, (Note: Albanian: Despotati e Vlorës dhe Kanina, Serbian: Деспотовина Валона и Канина, romanized: Despotovina Valona i Kanina, Bulgarian: Деспотство Вльора и Канина, romanized: Despotstvo Vlora i Kanina) Principality of Valona (Note: Albanian: Principata e Vlorës, Serbian: Валонска кнежевина, romanized: Valonska kneževina, Bulgarian: Валонско княжество, romanized: Valonsko knyazhestvo) or Principality of Vlorë (1346–1417) was a medieval principality in Albania, roughly encompassing the territories of the modern counties of Vlorë (Valona), Fier, and Berat. Initially a vassal of the Serbian Empire, it became an independent lordship after 1355, although de facto under Venetian influence, and remained as such until it was conquered by the Ottoman Turks in 1417.

== History ==
The strategically important city of Valona, on the coast of modern Albania, had been fought over repeatedly between the Byzantines and various Italian powers in the 13th century. Finally conquered by Byzantium in ca. 1290, it was one of the chief imperial holdings in the Balkans. Byzantine rule lasted until the 1340s, when the Serbian ruler Stefan Dušan, taking advantage of a Byzantine civil war, took Albania. Valona fell in late 1345 or early 1346, and Dušan placed his brother-in-law, John Asen, brother of the Bulgarian Tsar Ivan Alexander, in charge of Valona as his capital, and with Kanina and Berat as his main fortresses. According to some scholars, however, Dušan had captured Valona and Kanina already in 1337. The extent of John's authority over this territory is unclear; it is not known whether he was limited to the rule of these fortified cities, or whether his authority was more extensive, with the various local chieftains of central Albania reporting to him as a representative of Dušan.

John was granted the rank of Despot by Dušan, and went on to solidify his control over his new territory by portraying himself as the heir to the Despots of Epirus. To that end, he married Anna Palaiologina, the widow of Despot John II Orsini, adopted the trappings of the Byzantine court, took on the surname "Komnenos" that was traditionally borne by the Epirote rulers, and signed his documents in Greek. After Dušan's death in 1355, John established himself as an independent lord. He maintained close relations with Venice (whose citizen he became) and with Simeon Uroš, ruler of Epirus in the south. Under his rule, Valona prospered through trade with Venice and the Republic of Ragusa (mod. Dubrovnik).

John died in 1363 from the plague, and was succeeded by Alexander, possibly his son, who ruled until ca. 1368. He continued his father's policies, maintaining close ties with Ragusa, whose citizenship he acquired.

After Balsha II married Comita, the daughter of Andrea II Muzaka in 1372, he was granted control of Vlorë and Kaninë as part of her dowry. This agreement, established after the death of Alexander Komnenos Asen in 1371, ensured Balsha's support in conflicts against mutual enemies like Marko. While it remains unclear whether Muzaka had already taken the cities or if Balsha intended to conquer them, the marriage solidified Balsha's claim to these territories.

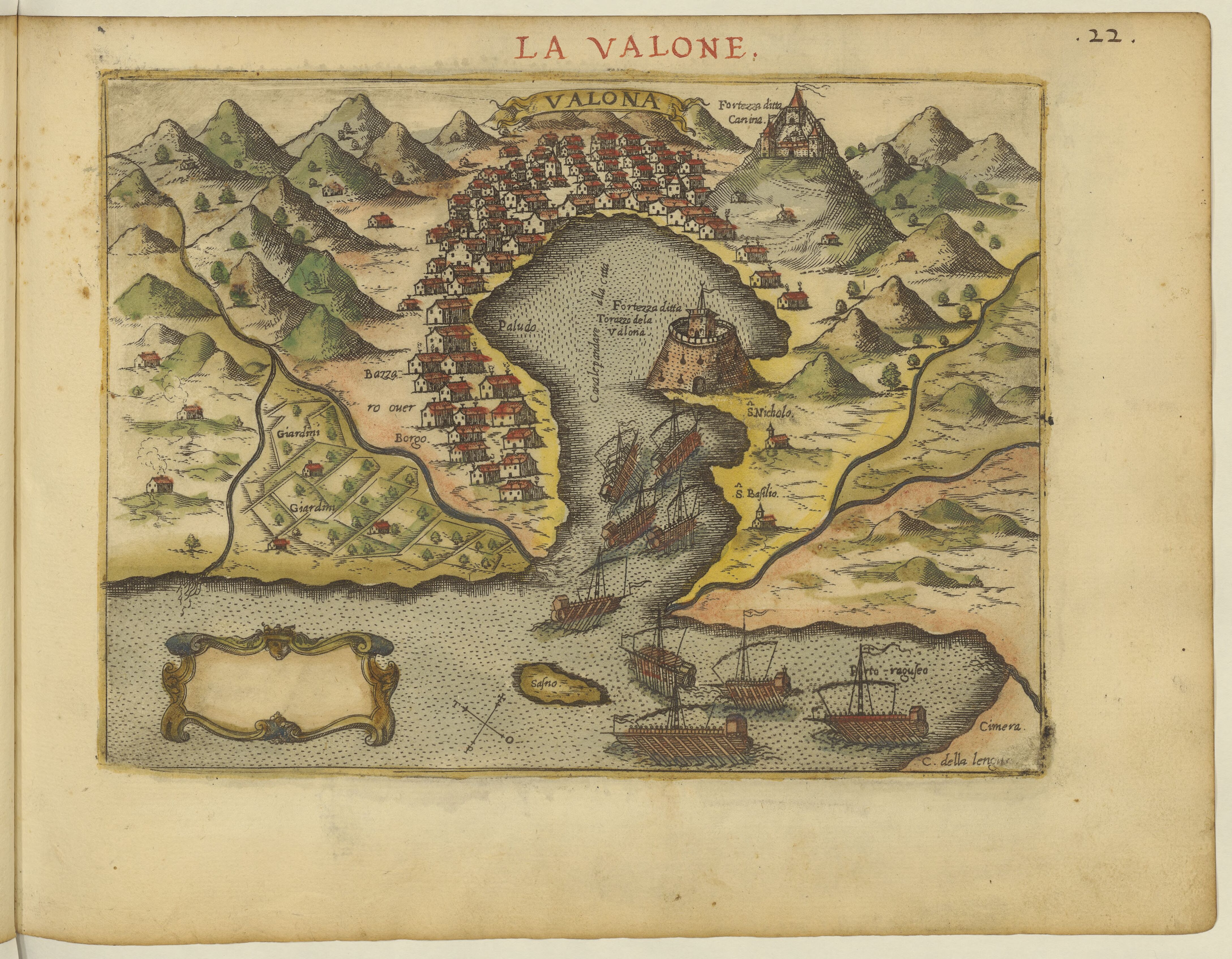
Vlorë in 1571.

Many of Valona's citizens fled to the island of Saseno and asked for Venetian protection. Balsha continued to expand his territory in the western Balkans, inheriting Zeta in 1378 and conquering Dyrrhachium from Karl Topia soon after, whereupon he assumed the title "Duke of Albania", probably after the former Venetian province of the same name. Thopia called on the Ottomans for help however, and Balsha was killed in the Battle of Savra near Berat in 1385. His widow Comita recovered control of her patrimonial territory, and ruled it thereafter jointly with her daughter Rugina (or Rudina). Berat however had already fallen to the Muzaka, and their lordship was now confined to the area around Vlorë, with Kaninë, Himarë and the fort of Pyrgos.

The principality was now faced with the ever-increasing Ottoman threat; in 1386, Balsha's widow offered to cede Valona to Venice in exchange for aid, but the Republic refused, since Valona alone without her hinterland was indefensible. Following the decisive Ottoman victory at the Battle of Kosovo in 1389, the situation became yet more precarious. A similar offer in 1393 was also rejected by a Venice anxious not to antagonize the Ottomans, but another, more comprehensive proposal, followed two years later. Through the bishop of Albania, the widow offered to the handover of the entire principality in exchange for a lifelong pension for her and her family of some 7,000 ducats drawn, from the principality's revenue (estimated at 9,000 ducats). Negotiations faltered after the widow's death in 1396. She was succeeded by Rugina, who in 1391 had married Mrkša Žarković. According to Italian sources, the principality was called the Kingdom of Serbia during Mrkša'a period. Threatened by Ottoman expansion, both Balsha's widow and Mrkša repeatedly offered to surrender Valona and their principality to the Venetians, but they refused or procrastinated. After Mrkša's death in 1414, he was briefly succeeded by his widow Rugina, until the Ottomans took the city in 1417.

The Venetian bailo at Constantinople tried to obtain the return of the territory to Rugina, who was a Venetian citizen, or alternatively purchase it for the Republic with up to 8,000 ducats, but nothing came of it. With the exception of a brief Venetian occupation in 1690–91, the region remained under Ottoman rule until the First Balkan War and the establishment of an independent Albanian state.

== Rulers ==
- John Komnenos Asen (1346–1363), Despot
- Alexander Komnenos Asen (1363–1372), Lord of Valona and Kanina
- Balsha II (1372–1385), Lord of Kanina and Valona, and eventually Duke of Albania (Latin: magnificus dominus Balsa Balsich, Gente, Canine et Avlone dominus)
- Comita Muzaka (1385–1396)
- Mrkša Žarković (1396–1414), variously styled lord of Valona (Latin: dominus Avlonae), lord of Kanina (Greek: ἡγεμὼν Κανίνων) or King of Serbia (Italian: Ré di Serbia)
- Rugjina Balsha (1414–1417)

== See also ==
- Albanian principalities
- History of Albania

== Sources ==
- Ducellier, Alain (1981). La façade maritime de l'Albanie au Moyen Age. Durazzo et Valona du ΧIe au XVe siècle [The Albanian Seaboard in the Middle Ages. Durazzo and Valona from the 11th to the 15th Century] (in French). Thessaloniki: Institute for Balkan Studies.
- Fine, John V. A. (1994) [1987]. The Late Medieval Balkans: A Critical Survey from the Late Twelfth Century to the Ottoman Conquest. Ann Arbor, Michigan: University of Michigan Press. ISBN 978-0-472-10079-8.
- Miller, William (1921). "Miscellanea from the Near East: I. Valona". Essays on the Latin Orient. Cambridge: Cambridge University Press. pp. 429–441.
- Nikolov-Zikov, Petar (2012), Dinastiyata na Sracimirovci, New Bulgarian University, ISBN 978-954-535-702-2
- Soulis, George Christos (1984), The Serbs and Byzantium during the reign of Tsar Stephen Dušan (1331–1355) and his successors, Dumbarton Oaks, ISBN 0-88402-137-8
- Srpsko učeno društvo (1881). Glasnik Srpskoga učenog društva ..., Volume 49. U Beogradu.
