= Ruđina Balšić =

Medieval Zetan noblewoman of the Balšić family

Ruđina Balšić Руђина Балшић Rugjina Balsha
- Princess of Zeta; Lady of Vlorë, Berat, Kaninë and Himarë
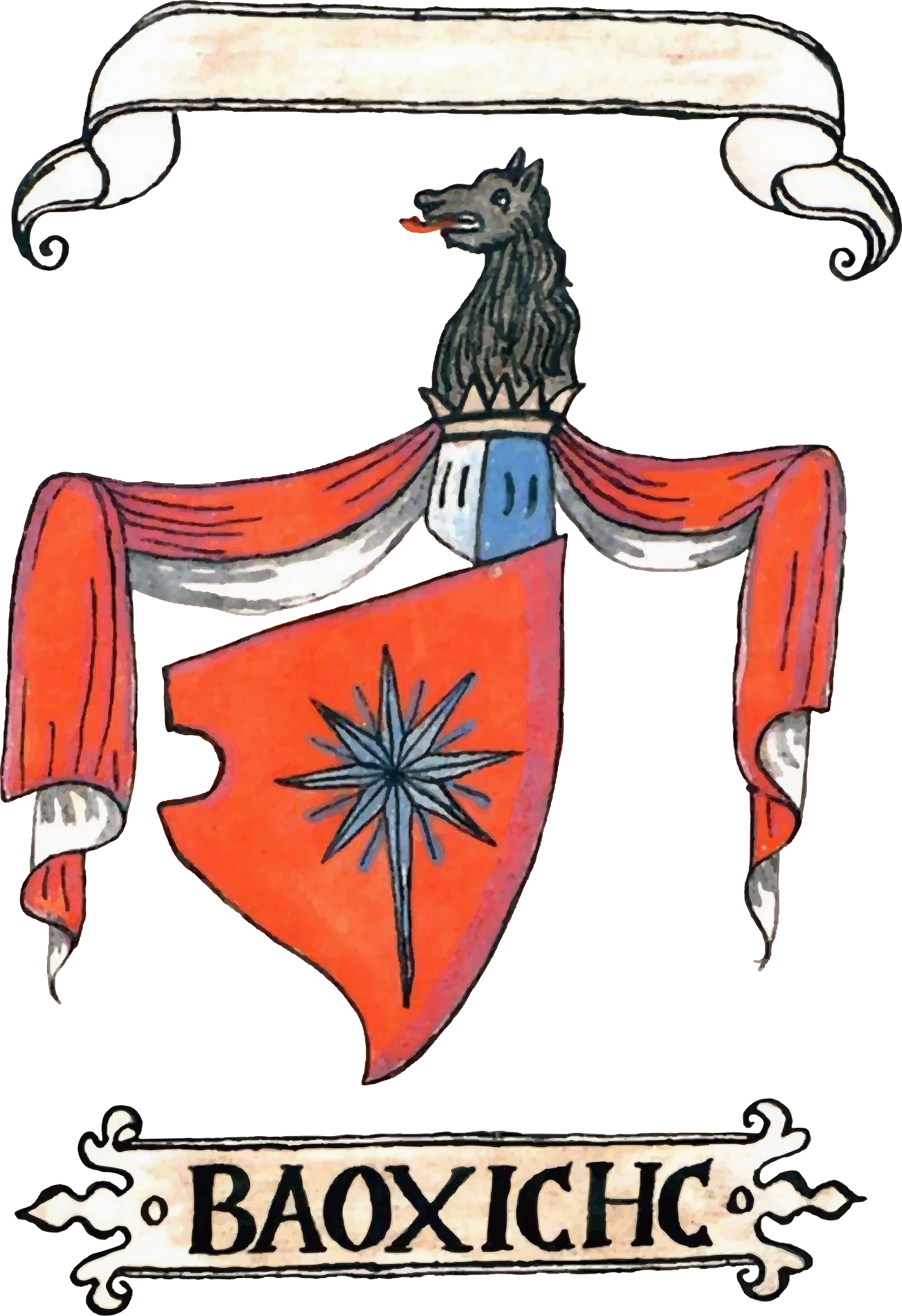
- Coat of Arms of the Balšić family

Lady of Vlorë, Berat, Kaninë and Himarë
- Reign: 1414–1417
- Predecessor: Mrkša Žarković
- Born: 14th century
- Spouse: Mrkša Žarković (m. 1391; died 1414)
- House: Balšić
- Father: Balša II
- Mother: Comita Muzaka

Ruđina Balšić (Serbian Cyrillic: Руђина Балшић, Albanian: Rugjina Balsha; fl. 1396–1420) was a Zetan noblewoman, from the Balšić family, who ruled over parts of modern-day Montenegro and Albanian. She married Mrkša Žarković and inherited his realm, the Principality of Vlorë, when he died in 1414. After unsuccessful negotiations to sell her duchy to the Venetians, the Ottomans captured it in 1417. She fled to Corfu, then to Zeta where she was governess of Budva from 1418. In 1420, during the Second Scutari War, she surrendered Budva to the Venetians without any resistance and moved to Dubrovnik with the town's treasury.

== Family and marriage ==
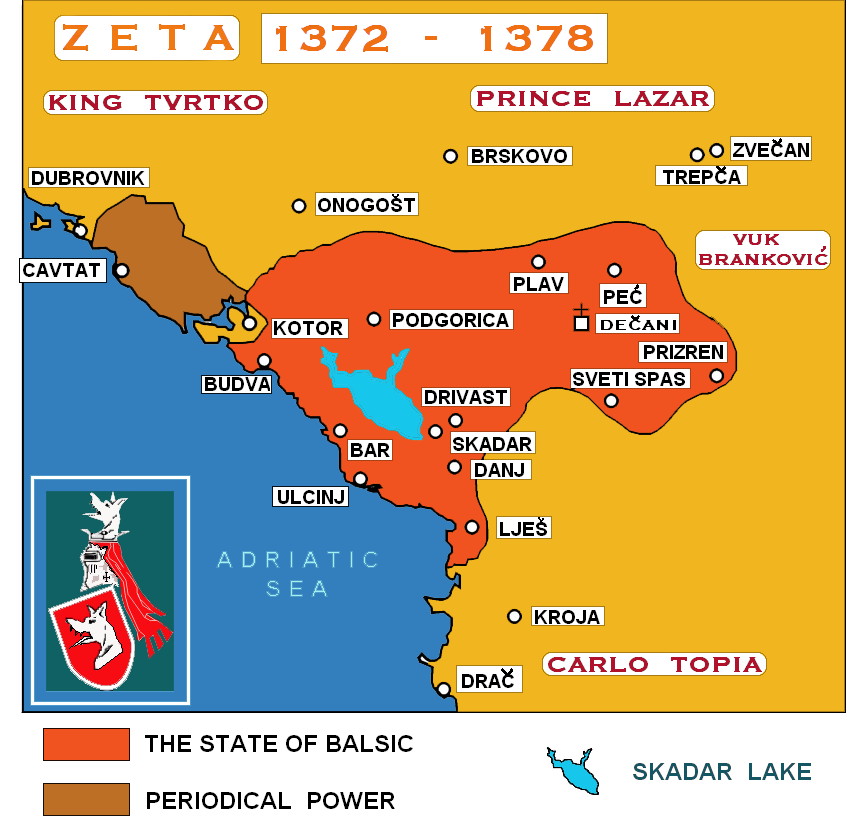
Balšić dominion between 1372 and 1378

Ruđina (or Rugina, Rudina) was the daughter of Balša II, the lord of Zeta (1378–85), and Comita Muzaka daughter of Andrea II Muzaka. In 1391 Ruđina married nobleman Mrkša Žarković. Their marriage was blessed by the Archbishop of Ohrid, although it was seen as noncanonical because they were close relatives. In 1397 she and her mother were given citizenship of the Republic of Ragusa.

== Duchess of Vlorë, Kaninë, Himare and Berat ==
After her husband's death in 1414, Ruđina inherited control over Vlorë and held it until it fell to the Ottomans in 1417. She offered Vlorë to the Republic of Venice in exchange for 10,000 ducats. The Venetians were interested in gaining control over Vlorë in order to prevent the Ottomans from controlling entrance into the Adriatic Sea. While the Venetians prolonged negotiations with Ruđina hoping to get a better price, the Ottomans captured Vlorë in June 1417.

== Governess of Budva ==
After the Ottoman conquest of Vlorë, Ruđina had to flee, first to Corfu and then to Zeta, which was ruled by her nephew, Balša III, who entrusted her with the governorship of the coastal town of Budva in 1418. When the Venetians sent a naval squadron to the port of Budva in 1419 during the Second Scutari War, Ruđina surrendered the town without any resistance and fled to the Republic of Ragusa (Dubrovnik) with the town's treasury.

== Family tree ==
Ancestors of Ruđina Balšić

4. Balša I
2. Balša II
5. Unknown
1. Rugjina Balsha
12. Teodor I Muzaka
6. Andrea II Muzaka
26. Pal Gropa
13. Unknown
3. Comita Muzaka
14. Paul Mataranga
7. Euphemia Mataranga
15. Unknown

== See also ==
- Balšić family
- Muzaka family

== Sources ==
- Fine, John V. A. (1994). The Late Medieval Balkans: A Critical Survey from the Late Twelfth Century to the Ottoman Conquest. University of Michigan Press. ISBN 0-472-08260-4.
- Gavrilović, Slavko (1981). Istorija srpskog naroda. Vol. 2. Srpska književna zadruga. pp. 11, 13, 16, 48, 109–110, 166, 174, 177.
- Grozdanov, Cvetan; Krsteski, Ǵorǵi; Alčev, Petar (1980). Ohridsko zidno slikarstvo XIV veka. Institut za istoriju umetnosti, Filozofski fakultet.
- Мишић, Синиша (2010). Лексикон градова и тргова средњовековних српских земаља: према писаним изворима. Завод за уџбенике. ISBN 978-86-17-16604-3.
- Purković, Miodrag Al (1956). Princeze iz kuće Nemanjića. AV ALA printing and publishing.
- umetnosti, Srpska akademija nauka i (1983). Glas.
- Veselinović, Andrija; Ljušić, Radoš (2008). Srpske dinastije. Službene glasink. ISBN 978-86-7549-921-3.

Ruđina Balšić Balšić noble family Born: ? Died: ?
Regnal titles
Preceded by Mrkša Žarković	Duchess of Valona and Kanina; 1414–1417	Succeeded by Principality dissestablished after Ottomans captured it
Preceded by unknown	Governess of Budva; 1418–1419	Succeeded by Venetian Republic
