= Mrkša Žarković =

Medieval Serbian nobleman of the Zarkovic family

- Lord of Vlorë, Berat, Kaninë and Himarë
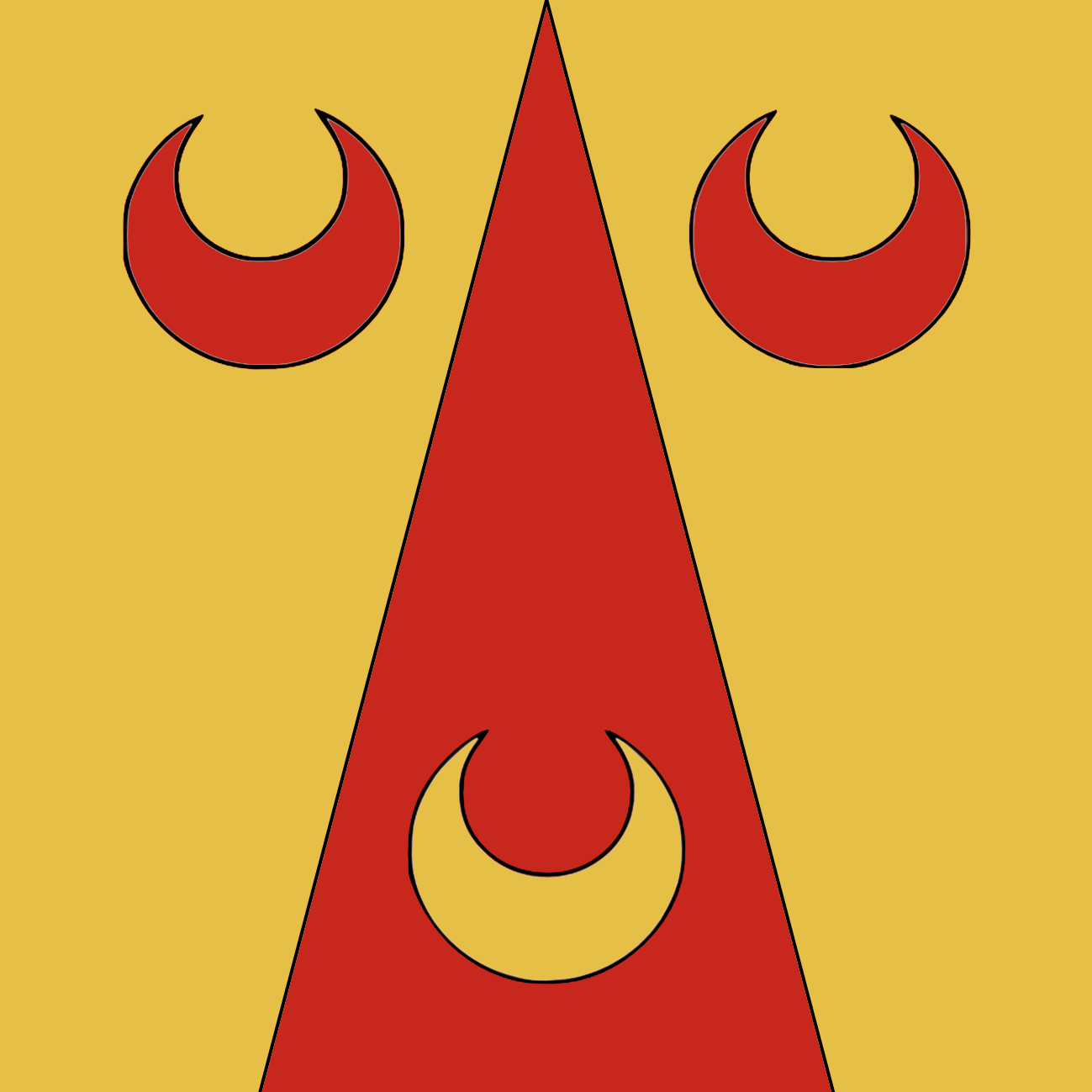
- Coat of arms of the Žarković family

Lord of Vlorë, Berat, Kaninë and Himarë
- Reign: 1396–1414
- Predecessor: Comita Muzaka
- Successor: Ruđina Balšić
- Born: 1363
- Died: 1414 (aged 50–51); Vlorë
- Spouse: Ruđina Balšić (m. 1391)
- House: Žarković
- Father: Žarko
- Mother: Teodora Dejanović

Mrkša Žarković (Serbian Cyrillic: Мркша Жарковић) was a Serbian nobleman who ruled parts of today's southern Albania from 1396 to 1414.

== Early life and marriage ==
Mrkša was the son of Žarko, who was mentioned in 1356–1357 as ruling over a region at the mouth of the river Buna. Mrkša's mother was Teodora Dejanović, the daughter of Dejan, one of Stefan Dušan's magnates. After Žarko's death, Teodora married Đurađ I Balšić.

In 1391, Mrkša married Ruđina Balšić, the daughter of Balša II, a lord in Zeta, and Komnina Asen, daughter of Jovan Asen. Due to the fact that his mother already married into the Balšić noble family by marrying Đurađ I, Mrkša's marriage to another member of the Balšić was therefore contrary to the canon law of the Eastern church. In 1394, Mrkša sent a monk by the name of Athanasius to the patriarch of Constantinople to request that his union be blessed by the archbishop of Ohrid and that his marriage was dictated by the risk posed by the advancing Ottoman Turks. In response, the patriarch answered that he could neither forbid nor confirm Mrkša's marriage, and he advised the couple to lead pious lives. Balša II ruled over Valona, Berat, Kanina, and Himarë in the south of Albania. After Balša II's death in the Battle of Savra, his wife Komnina ruled over his territory until 1396, when she became a nun and gave her territories to son-in-law Mrkša. Mrkša became Lord of Berat, Valona and Kanina.

== Rule ==
In 1396, Mrkša offered Valona, Berat, Himarë and the tower of Pyrgos to the Venetians in response to the Ottoman advances. The Venetians refused, prompting Mrkša to unsuccessfully turn to the Ragusans for leave to deposit his property there for safekeeping. In 1398, Mrkša again attempted to transfer his possessions to the Venetians, who decided to send an admiral to inquire about the revenues and conditions of said possessions. However, the inquiry was not yet complete by 1400, prompting Mrkša to send yet another envoy to the Venetians only to receive the same response as last time.

Mrkša's headquarters seemed to be in Kanina, and he was made an honorary citizen of both Venice and Ragusa. A number of magnates were mentioned as part of his court, which consisted primarily of Slavs and Greeks: Miralija, David, Janja Janjetić, George Kavedatis and the Albanian Kosta Bardha.

== Aftermath ==
Mrkša was able to retain his territories until his death in October 1414. After his death, his wife Ruđina tried to transfer Mrkša's possessions to the Republic of Venice in 1415 and 1416, but an agreement was never reached. By 1417, the whole area was conquered by the Ottoman Empire, who had occupied Berat, Janina and Pyrgos. The Ottomans also burned and plundered Valona before appointing the Turkish general Hamza-beg as governor of Valona. Ruđina fled to Corfu. Thus, the Ottomans officially controlled a port on the Adriatic Sea and began to build their navy in the region, threatening the Venetians. In response, the Venetians unsuccessfully attempted to persuade Sultan Mehmed I in 1418 to restore Ruđina (who was also an honorary citizen of Venice) as the ruler of Valona and the other lost possessions.

== Sources ==
- Martha Ross (1978). Rulers and Governments of the World: Earliest Times to 1491. Bowker. ISBN 978-0-85935-021-1.

Regnal titles
Preceded by Komnina Balšić	Duke of Valona and Kanina; 1396–1414	Succeeded by Ruđina Balšić
