= Žarko (nobleman) =

Serbian nobleman

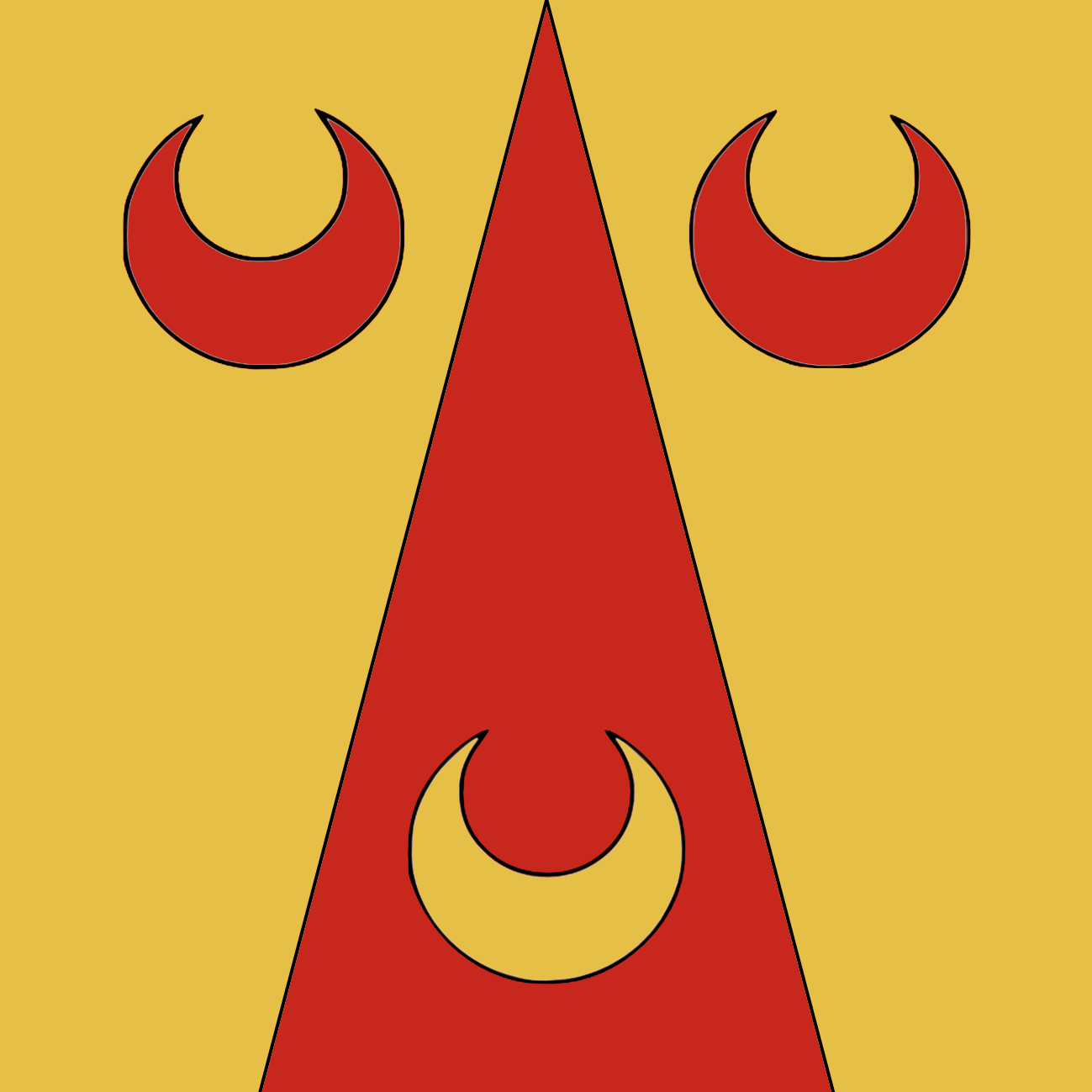
- Coat of arms
- Successor: Mrkša
- Born: 1336
- Died: before 1371
- Family: Žarković
- Spouse: Teodora Dejanović
- Issue: Mrkša Žarković

Žarko (Serbian Cyrillic: Жарко; 1336–before 1371) was a 14th-century Serbian nobleman. After the death of Serbian Emperor Dušan the Mighty (r. 1331–1355†), he became a lord of the coasts of the Zeta region, under the succeeding Emperor Uroš the Weak (r. 1355–1371).

Around 1356 he married Teodora Dejanović, the daughter of Dejan Dragaš and Theodora Nemanjić (sister of Dušan and Symeon Siniša). Together, they had a son, Mrkša, in 1363.

He is mentioned in records from 1356, when he raided some traders from Dubrovnik, not far from Sveti Srđ at Lake Skadar. Zeta itself was held by the widow of Dušan, Jelena, who at the time was in Serres where she had her court. The next year, in June, he became a citizen of the Republic of Venice, where he was known as a baron lord of the Serbian King, with holdings in the Zeta region and Bojana of the maritime.

In 1360, Balša I and his sons were mentioned as "lords of Skadar", thus, he may have either lost his position or died. After his death, the widow Teodora remarried with Đurađ Balšić. His son Mrkša married Ruđina Balšić, the daughter of Balša II, in 1396 and held the title of oblast around Valona and Kanina.

== See also ==
- Đuraš Ilijić, contemporary Lord of Upper Zeta

Titles of nobility
New title Stefan of Dečani as Prince of Zeta	Gospodin of Lower Zeta (maritime); Under Uroš the Weak (Serbian Empire) fl. 1356/7	Succeeded by Balša I
