= Balša I =

Member of the Balšić noble family

Balša I Балша I Balsha I
- Lord of Zeta
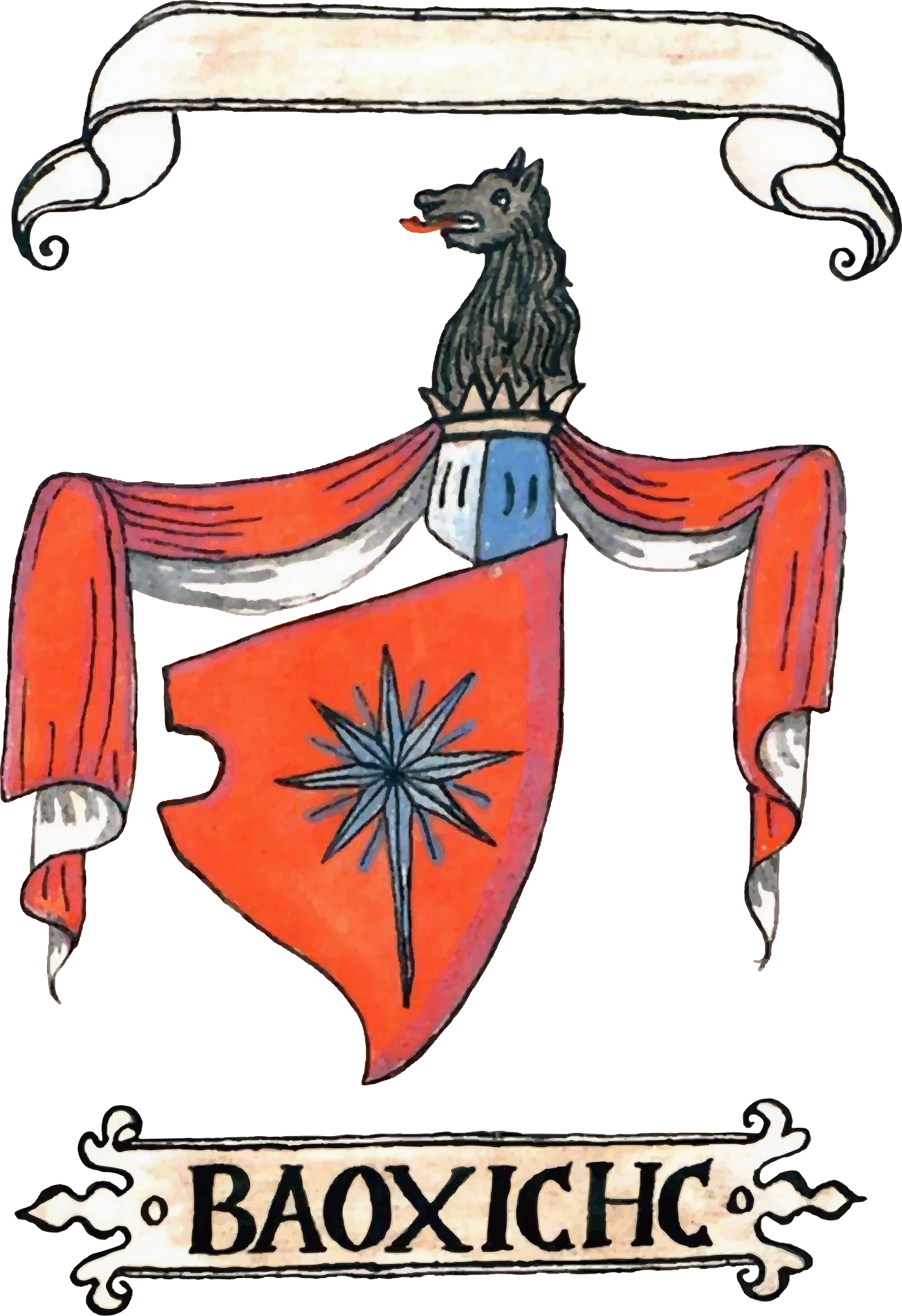
- Coat of Arms of the Balšić family

Lord of Zeta
- Reign: 1356–1362
- Successor: Đurađ I Balšić
- Died: 1362
- Issue: Đurađ I Balšić; Stracimir Balšić; Balša II; Voisava Balšić
- House: Balšić

Balša (Serbian Cyrillic: Балша; Albanian: Balsha) or Balsha was a provincial lord of the Zeta in ca. 1362. He is the eponymous founder of the Balšić noble family.

== Life ==
He was a nobleman and military commander during the rule of Serbian Emperor Dušan the Mighty (r. 1331–1355) but managed to expand his power after the death of Dušan (20 December 1355) and gained control of the island of Mljet. He began by taking lands previously held by Lord Žarko, in Lower Zeta (south of Lake Skadar, and is then recognized as a "provincial lord" in charters of Serbian Emperor Stefan Uroš V (r. 1355–1371). In 1362 his sons defeated and killed Head of Upper Zeta Đuraš Ilijić and expanded further into Upper Zeta. He is believed to have died by this time.

He had three sons, Đurađ, Stracimir and Balša II, two of whom ruled the Principality of Zeta: Đurađ I and Balša II. He had a daughter Voisava Balšić who married Karl Thopia.

Balša I Balšić noble family Born: ? Died: before 1362
Regnal titles
Preceded by Đuraš Ilijić Žarko (Serbian Empire)	Lord of Zeta; 1360–1362	Succeeded by Đurađ I
