= Alexander Komnenos Asen =

Medieval Bulgarian nobleman of the Sratsimir family

- Sebastos of Vlorë; Lord of Berat, Vlorë and Kaninë
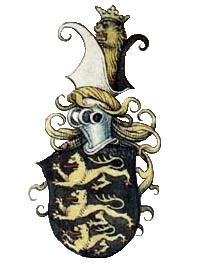
- Coat of Arms of the Sratsimir family

Lord of Berat, Vlorë and Kaninë
- Reign: 1363–1371
- Predecessor: John Komnenos Asen
- Successor: Balsha II
- Born: 1340
- Died: 26 September 1371 (aged 30–31); Battle of Maritsa
- House: Sratsimir
- Father: John Komnenos Asen

Alexander Komnenos Asen (Greek: Αλέξανδρος Κομνηνός Ασέν; Bulgarian: Александър Комнин Асен) was the son of Despot John Komnenos Asen and nephew of Emperor Ivan Alexander of Bulgaria and Empress Helena of Serbia.

Alexander Komnenos was Sebastos of Valona and Lord of Kanine and Valona which he succeeded from his father John (alternatively Ivan) Komnenos, however he lost both cities to Andrea II Muzaka in battle shortly after inheriting them. He did not succeed the nearby city of Belgrad which was occupied by the Principality of Muzaka. Alexander's rule was characterized by extensive trade with both the Republic of Venice and the Republic of Ragusa.

It is speculated that he died on 26 September 1371 at the Battle of Maritsa because in 1372 his lands were in possession of Balsha II.
