= Balšić noble family =

Medieval noble family

Balšić Балшић Balsha Balshaj
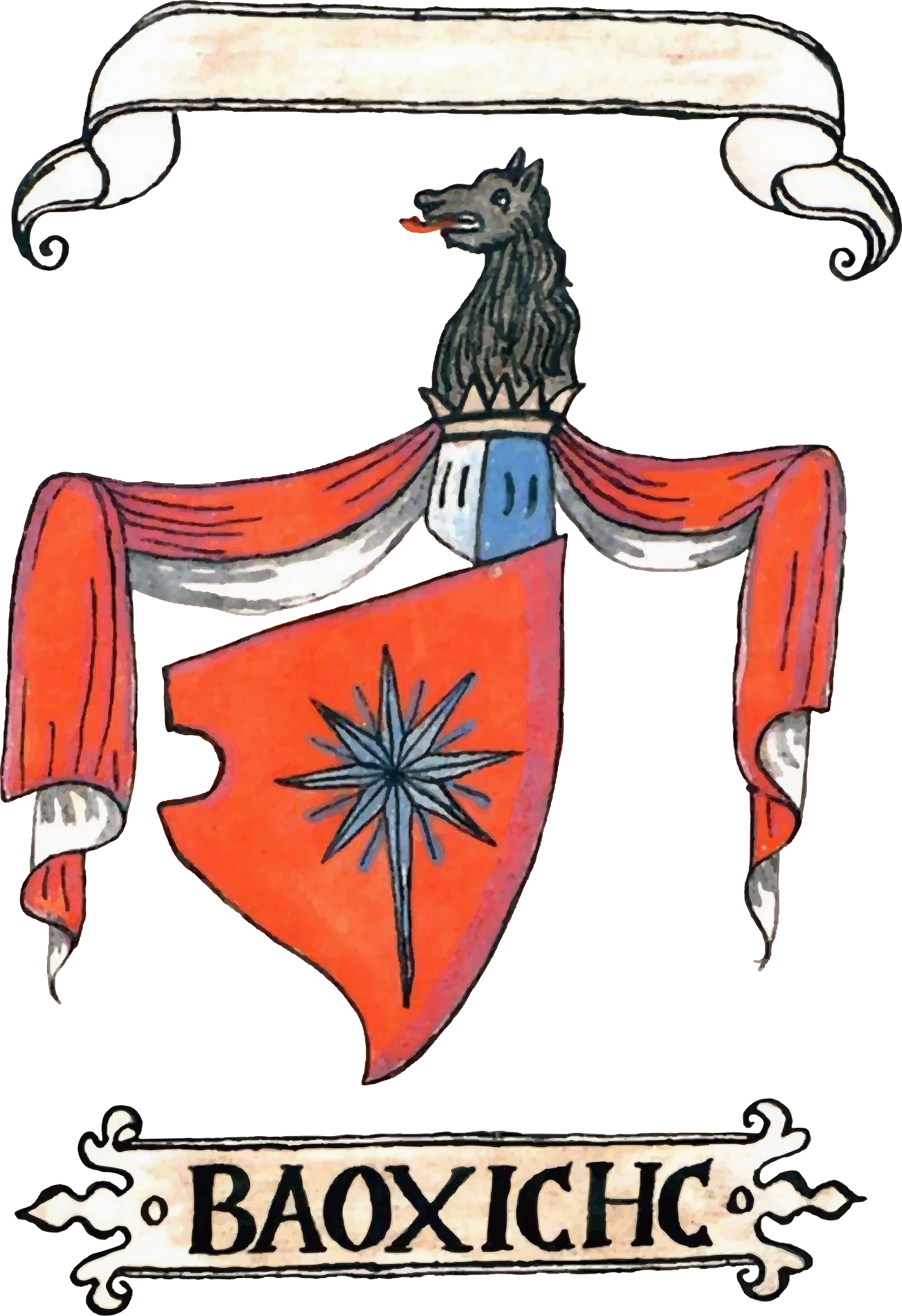
- Coat of arms of the Balšić based on an illustration found in the Fojnica Armorial, a catalog of coats of arms, whereby the family name is inscribed.
- Country: Lordship of Zeta (1355–1421); Serbian Empire (1355–71); Republic of Venice (1380s); Serbian Despotate (1405–21); League of Lezhë (1444–1479)
- Founded: before 1355, by Balša I
- Final ruler: Balša III (1403–1421)
- Titles: gospodar (lord) autokrator (self-ruler)
- Estates: the Zeta and the coastlands (southern Montenegro, northern Albania)

The House of Balšić (Serbian Cyrillic: Балшићи; Albanian: Balsha, Balshaj), or Balsha, were a noble family that ruled "Zeta and the coastlands" (current-day southern Montenegro and northern Albania), from 1362 to 1421, during and after the fall of the Serbian Empire. Balša, the founder, was a petty nobleman who held only one village during the rule of Emperor Dušan the Mighty (r. 1331–1355), and only after the death of the emperor, his three sons gained power in Lower Zeta after acquiring the lands of gospodin Žarko (fl. 1336–1360) under unclear circumstances, and they then expanded into Upper Zeta by murdering voivode and čelnik Đuraš Ilijić (r. 1326–1362†). Nevertheless, they were acknowledged as oblastni gospodari of Zeta in edicts of Emperor Uroš the Weak (r. 1355–1371). After the death of Uroš (1371), the family feuded with the Mrnjavčevići, who controlled Macedonia.

When the last lord of the main branch of the family, Balša III died in 1421 without an heir, his possessions were passed on to his uncle, Despot Stefan the Tall. Later that year, the Republic of Venice took advantage of Balša's death and seized the towns of Bar and Ulcinj, and some of his other territories were seized by the Ottomans and Bosnians.

== Origin ==
The origin of the eponymous founder of the Balšić family – Balša I – is obscure and several hypotheses about it have been put forward by modern scholars. The region the family ruled over was defined by highly porous borders and experienced high rates of intermarriage among the local peoples' aristocracies.

Contemporary medieval sources provide evidence for the Albanian ethnic belonging of the Balšić family members and the description of the noble family as Albanian lords is present in current scholarship, (Note: e.g.: Tafilica, Baze & Lafe 2023, p. 74; Ivetic 2022, p. 25; Rojas Molina 2022, p. 90; Ćirković 2020, pp. 396–397; Muhadri 2020, pp. 38–39; Muhaj 2019, p. 205; Schmitt 2020, p. 18; Xhufi 2019, p. 50; Molla 2017, p. 211; Campobasso 2016, p. 17; Lee, Lubin & Ndreca 2013, p. 46; Vaccaro 2011, p. 224.) A number of scholars consider them of Serbian or of otherwise Slavic origin. Both Serbian and Albanian authors claim them.

=== Contemporary sources ===
In medieval Serbian documents the Balšas are referred to as "Arbanas lords". The well-known Bulgarian biographer of the 15th century, Constantine the Philosopher, who lived in the court of the Serbian ruler Stefan Lazarević, refers to Đurađ II Balšić and Balša III as Albanian lords. Historical sources from Ragusa document the Albanian ethnic affiliation of the Balša family, mentioning "the Albanian customs of the Balša". In the funds of the Ragusan archives the Balšićs are one of the extremely present Arbanon families. Furthermore, the Ottomans referred to Đurađ II Balšić as "ruler of Albanian Shkodra". Also the Hungarian king Sigismund, when he met him personally in 1396, called him "ruler of Albania". One contemporary archival source in Vienna Archives mentions Balša II as "ruler of Albanians" during the Battle of Kosovo 1389.

The fragmental assertions that their progenitor descended from "Emperor Nemanja", and that he held the area of Bojana river in the neighborhood of Shkodër are very uncertain. In a 14th-century letter, Đurađ II Balšić claimed descent from the Nemanjić family.

=== Modern historiography ===
In current scholarship many historians consider the Balša as being part of the local Albanian nobility. According to Malcolm, the Balšići were probably of Albanian stock who had been but culturally Serbianized to a large degree. Ćirković concluded that they are of non-Slavic origin, being referred to in medieval Serbian documents as "Albanian (arbanas) lords". Murzaku says that the family had an Albanian origin. Madgearu mentions the Balšić as a noble Albanian family, however he states that their Albanian origin is unclear, due to the debate over the family's origin. Bartl mentions the Balšić as a noble family of probably Serbian origin. Elsie mentions them as of "probably Slavic origin". Gelichi considers them Serbian-Montenegrin. Winnifrith states that they were Slavs who fought other Albanians. Brendan Osswald has described them as Serbian, as does Iordachi. Bojka Djukanovic describes them as a "Montenegrin family" about whose origin there are no reliable sources. Other Montenegrin authors consider them to be a Montenegrin dynasty as well. According to Elizabeth Roberts, whether their origins were Serbian, Albanian, or both, has never been conclusively established, but they were "culturally Serbianized". According to Svetlana Tomin the Balšići probably originated from Slavicized Vlachs. Montenegrin historian Dragoje Živković believes that the Balšićs came from the Slavicized Vlachs and that they rose to the noble class through military merits.

In older scholarship, Karl Hopf (1832–1873) considered "unquestionably part of the Serb tribe". Ivan Stepanovich Yastrebov (1839–1894), Russian Consul in Shkodër and Prizren, when speaking of the Balšići, connected their name to the Roman town of Balletium (Balec) located near modern Shkodër which delivers from Illyrian, related to the Albanian term ballë. According to Serbian historian Ilarion Ruvarac, "The Balšić were in no way Serbs but Albanians, regardless of whether they were Albanians or Vlachs in their distant origins". Serbian historian Vladimir Ćorović (1885–1941) concluded, based on their name, that they had Roman (Vlach) origin. Croatian ethnologist Milan Šufflay (1879–1931) mentioned them as of "Romanian and Vlach origin". Croatian linguist Petar Skok considered them to have been of Vlach origin, and Serbian historian Milena Gecić supported his theory. Giuseppe Gelcich theorized on the origin in his La Zedda e la dinastia dei Balšidi: studi storici documentati (1899). The theory, which was later adopted by Čedomilj Mijatović, argued that they were descendants of the Frankish nobleman Bertrand III of Baux, a companion of Charles d'Anjou. It is regarded as highly improbable. German linguist Gustav Weigand (1860–1930) supported a mixed Albanian–Aromanian origin after he noted that the family name was included in a list of early Albanian surnames in Romania.

== History ==
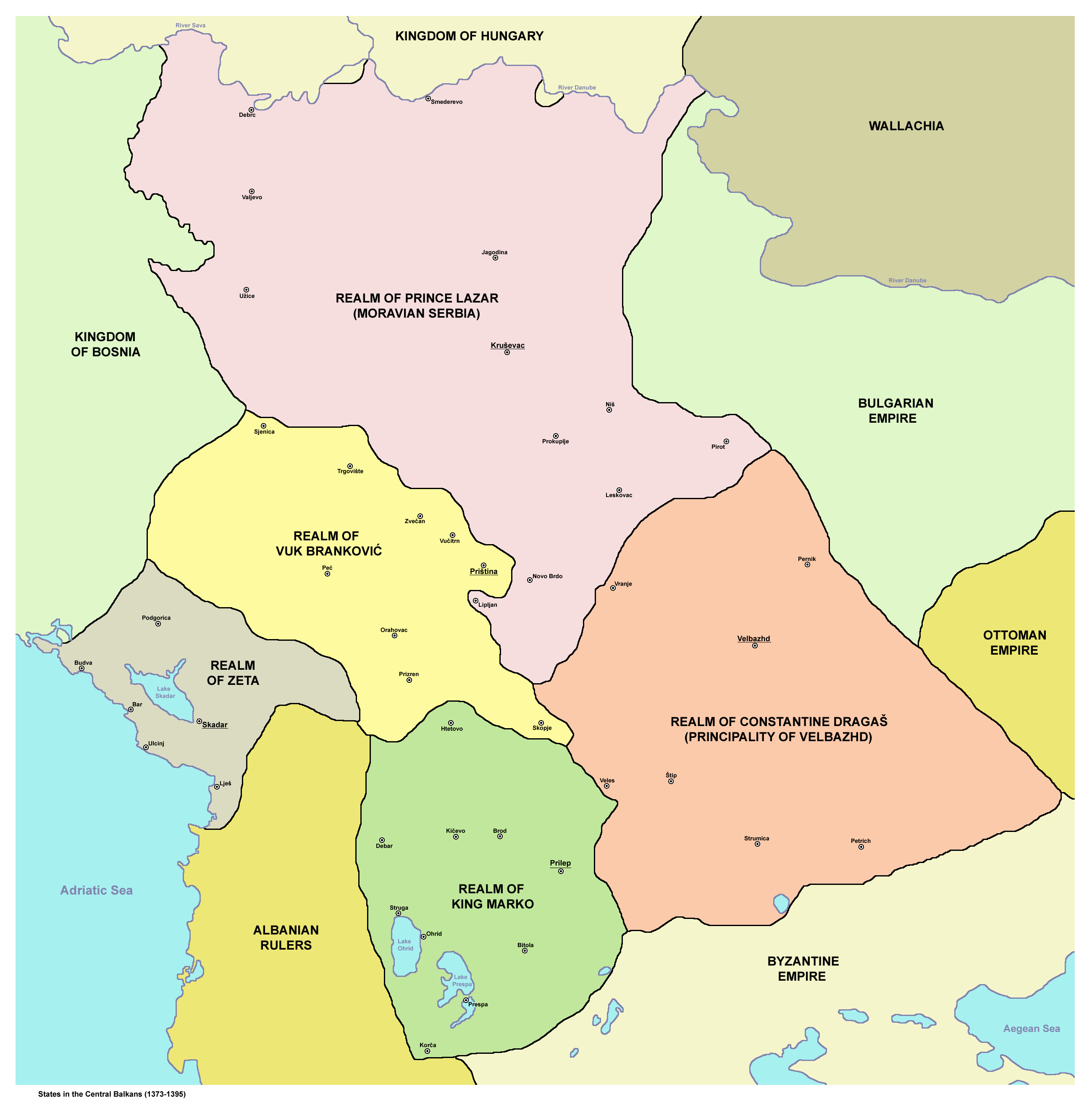
rough borders of the Serbian provincial lords during the fall of the Serbian Empire, 1373-1395 (Zeta in grey)

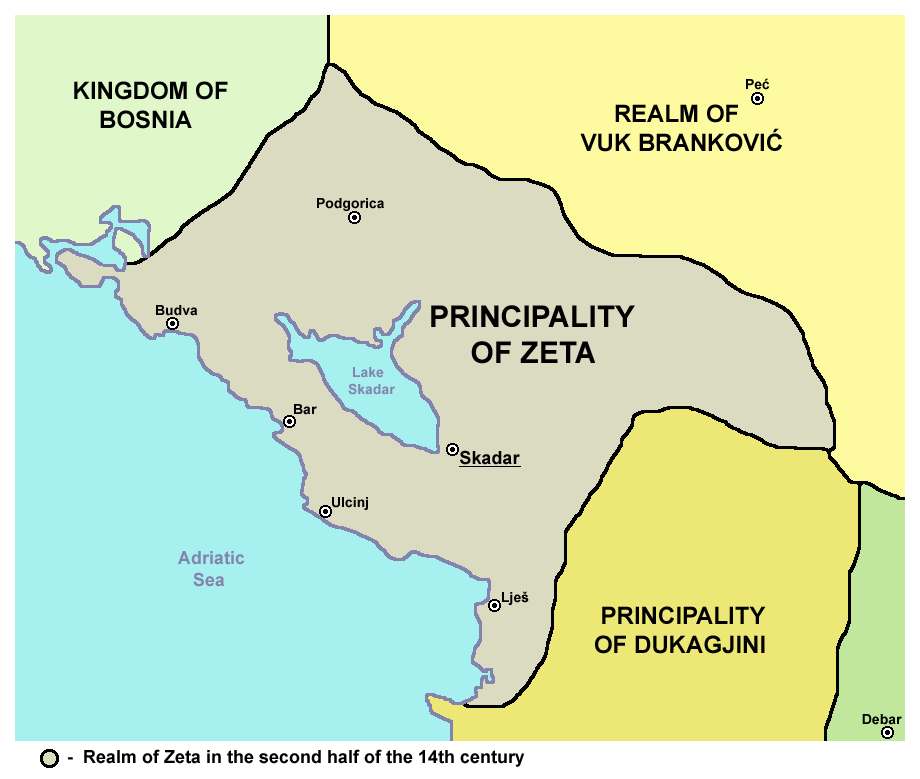
Zeta [Zoomed].

The oldest mention of any member of the family can be traced to a 1304 letter which Helen of Anjou sent to Ragusa through her trustee Matija Balšić. The earliest mention of the family itself can be traced to a charter of Serbian emperor Stefan Uroš V dated 29 September 1360, which is also the earliest known mention of its founder Balša. According to scholar Thomas Fleming, Balša was a "fairly obscure" magnate from the area surrounding Bar and Budva. Writing in 1601, Mavro Orbini describes him as a petty nobleman that held only one village in the area of Lake Skadar during the rule of Emperor Dušan the Mighty (r. 1331–1355). Only after the death of the emperor, Balša and his three sons gained power in Lower Zeta after acquiring the lands of gospodin Žarko (fl. 1336–1360) and by murdering voivode and čelnik Đuraš Ilijić (r. 1326-1362†), the holders of Lower and Upper Zeta, respectively. Balša dies the same year, and his sons, the Balšić brothers, continue in ruling the province spanning Podgorica, Budva, Bar and Shkodër. The three brothers converted to Catholicism in 1368 or 1369.

The family managed to elevate themselves from petty nobility to provincial lords. Following the Battle of Maritsa and the collapse of Serbian central state authority they were able to establish their own independent state. According to historian John V. A. Fine: "their lands, stretched from Peć and Prizren in the Kosovo to the coast, where they extended from the Gulf of Kotor (without Kotor itself)—and briefly between 1373 and 1377 beyond this gulf north to the borders of Dubrovnik's territory—south to the Mati River," and that through marriage they were also able to acquire the towns of Berat and Vlorë. The administrative and political center of Balša's feudal entity between 1355 and 1396 was the city of Shkodër, which also became the main center of a wide interregional economic network. The Balšić holdings declined at the end of the 1370s, the Bosnian King Tvrtko I annexed the coastal territories between Dubrovnik and the Bay of Kotor while Vuk Branković took Prizren and other land in Kosovo. By the reign of Đurađ II only the land between Shkodër and the coast was securely held.

Balšić family members founded and renovated several Eastern Orthodox monasteries and churches. Between 1368 and 1389 the Balšićs owned their own ships and operated as Albanian pirates. Because of their anti-Ottoman attitude, the pirate activity of these Albanian lords was tolerated by the Republic of Venice. However, they limited Venice's operations.

In the Prince-Bishopric and Principality of Montenegro, supporters of the Petrović-Njegoš dynasty claimed them to be descended from the Balšići, as well as the Nemanjić and Crnojević dynasties. Before World War II, the family was the namesake of the association football club GSK Balšić Podgorica.

== Heads ==
- Balša I (fl. 1360–62)
- Đurađ I (1362–1378), [Lord of] Shkodër
- Balša II (1378–1385), [Lord of] Shkodër and Durrës
- Đurađ II (1385–1403), [Lord of] Shkodër, Budva, Podgorica, Durrës,
  Drisht and Lezhë, Autokrat of Zeta and the coastlands
- Balša III (1403–1421), [Lord of] Bar

== Family tree ==
Simplified family tree:

- Balša I (fl. 1360–62)
  - Stracimir
    - Đurađ II Balšić
      - Balša III, married Mara Thopia (1st) and Boglia Zaharia (2nd)
        - Jelena Balšić, married Stjepan Vukčić Kosača
        - Unknown Son, died in infancy
        - Teodora Balšić, married Petar Vojsalić
  - Đurađ I, married Olivera Mrnjavčević (1st) and Teodora Dejanović (2nd)
    - Jelisaveta or Jelisanta (d. 1443), Olivera's daughter
    - Gojslava or Goisava (d. 1398), married Radič Sanković, lord of Nevesinje, Popovo Polje and Konavli
    - Jevdokija, married Esau de' Buondelmonti, the ruler of Epirus (1385–1411)
    - Konstantin, married Helena Thopia
      - Stefan Balšić "Maramonte" (fl. 1419–40), pretender to Zeta
    - Jelena or Elena
    - Đurađ or Gjergj (illegitimate)
      - George
      - Ivan
      - Gojko, married Comita Arianiti
        - Maria, Countess of Muro
  - Balša II, married Comita Muzaka
    - Ruđina Balšić, married Mrkša Žarković
  - Voisava Balšić, married Karl Thopia

== Bibliography ==
- Berisha, Gjon (2021). "Albanians in the Ragusan Sources during the Middle Ages". Tarih ve Gelecek Dergisi. 7 (2): 655–666. doi:10.21551/jhf.936658. eISSN 2458-7672.
- Ćirković, Sima M. (2004). The Serbs. Translated by Vuk Tošić. Hoboken, New Jersey: Blackwell Publishing. ISBN 978-1-40514-291-5.
- Campobasso, Gianvito (2016). "Alcune fonti per lo studio del Regnum Albaniae degli Angiò : documenti, epigrafi, araldica e visual evidences". Mélanges de l'École française de Rome: Moyen Âge. 128 (2). doi:10.4000/mefrm.3291.
- Ćirković, Sima (2020). Živeti sa istorijom. Belgrade: Helsinški odbor za ljudska prava u Srbiji.
- Djukanović, Bojka (2023). Historical Dictionary of Montenegro. Lanham, Maryland: Rowman & Littlefield. ISBN 978-1-53813-915-8.
- Fine, John V. A. (1994) [1987]. The Late Medieval Balkans: A Critical Survey from the Late Twelfth Century to the Ottoman Conquest. Ann Arbor, Michigan: University of Michigan Press. ISBN 978-0-472-10079-8.
- Fleming, Thomas (2002). Montenegro: The Divided Land. Rockford, Illinois: Chronicle Press. ISBN 978-0-9619-3649-5.
- Ivetic, Egidio (2022). History of the Adriatic: A Sea and Its Civilization. John Wiley & Sons. ISBN 9781509552535.
- Lee, Wayne E.; Lubin, Matthew; Ndreca, Eduard; et al. (L. Galaty, Michael; Mustafa, Mentor; Robert, Schon) (2013). "4: Archival Historical Research". Light and Shadow: Isolation and Interaction in the Shala Valley of Northern Albania. ISD LLC. ISBN 978-1938770913.
- Malcolm, Noel (1998). Kosovo: a short history. Macmillan. ISBN 978-0-333-66612-8.
- McCrery, Nigel (2023). Season in Hell: British Footballers Killed in the Second World War. Barnsley, England: Pen & Sword. ISBN 978-1-5267-1595-1.
- Molla, Nevila (2017). "The Survival and Revival of Urban Settlements". In John Moreland; John Mitchell; Bea Leal (eds.). Encounters, Excavations and Argosies: Essays for Richard Hodges. Archaeopress Publishing Ltd. pp. 208–216. ISBN 9781784916824.
- Muhadri, Bedri (2020). "Kosova në kuadrin e Principatës së Balshajve" [Kosovo as Part of the Balshaj Principality]. Studime Historike (in Albanian) (1–2). Albanian Institute of History. ISSN 0563-5799.
- Muhaj, Ardian (2019). Yayına Hazırlayanlar; Hasan Basri Öcalan Yusuf; Ziya Karaaslan (eds.). The Origins of the Rivalry Between the Ottomans and Venice in The Adriatic. Uluslararası Yıldırım Bayezid Sempozyumu, Bildiriler Kitabi, 27-29 Kasım 2015. Türk Tarih Kurumu. ISBN 978-975-16-3631-7.
- Nicol, Donald MacGillivray (2010), The Despotate of Epiros 1267–1479: A Contribution to the History of Greece in the Middle Ages, Cambridge University Press, ISBN 978-0-521-13089-9
- Pavlovic, Srdja (2008). Balkan Anschluss: The Annexation of Montenegro and the Creation of the Common South Slavic State. West Lafayette, Indiana: Purdue University Press. ISBN 978-1-5575-3465-1.
- Pavlowitch, Stevan K. (2002). Serbia: The History of an Idea. New York: New York University Press. ISBN 978-0-8147-6708-5.
- Petkov, Kiril (2014) [1964]. The Anxieties of a Citizen Class: The Miracles of the True Cross of San Giovanni Evangelista, Venice 1370-1480. The Medieval Mediterranean. Vol. 99. Brill. ISBN 9789004259812.
- Prifti, Kristaq (1993). The Truth on Kosova. Academy of Sciences of Albania, Institute of History.
- Roberts, Elizabeth (2007). Realm of the Black Mountain: A History of Montenegro. Ithaca, New York: Cornell University Press. ISBN 978-0-80144-601-6.
- Rojas Molina, Grabiela (2022). Decoding Debate in the Venetian Senate: Short Stories of Crisis and Response on Albania (1392-1402). The Medieval Mediterranean. Vol. 134. BRILL. ISBN 9789004520936.
- Rudić, Srđan (2006), Vlastela Ilirskog grbovnika, Istorijski institut, ISBN 9788677430559
- Schmitt, Oliver Jens (2020). "Ottoman Albania and Kosovo, Albanians and Serbs, sixteenth–eighteenth centuries". In John R. Lampe, Ulf Brunnbauer (ed.). The Routledge Handbook of Balkan and Southeast European History. Milton: Taylor & Francis Group. pp. 18–25. doi:10.4324/9780429464799-4. ISBN 9781138613089. S2CID 224981491.
- Soulis, George Christos (1984). The Serbs and Byzantium during the reign of Tsar Stephen Dušan (1331-1355) and his successors. Dumbarton Oaks Library and Collection. ISBN 978-0-88402-137-7.
- Tafilica, Zamir; Baze, Ermal; Lafe, Ols (2023). "Historical Background". In Galaty, Michael L.; Bejko, Lorenc (eds.). Archaeological Investigations in a Northern Albanian Province: Results of the Projekti Arkeologjik i Shkodrës (PASH): Volume One: Survey and Excavation Results. Memoirs Series. Vol. 64. University of Michigan Press. ISBN 9781951538736.
- Vaccaro, Attilio (2011). "Per una lettura dell'Albania medievale e delle guerre antiturche nei Balcani". Miscellanea di studi storici (XVI, 2009–2010). Rubettino: 223–275.
- Veselinović, Andrija & Ljušić, Radoš (2008). "Балшићи" Srpske dinastije. Službene glasink. ISBN 9788675499213.
- Xhufi, Pëllumb (2019). Skënderbeu: ideja dhe ndërtimi i shtetit. Dituria. ISBN 9789928292360.
