= Balša II =

Balša II Балша II Balsha II
- Lord of Zeta; Lord of Vlorë, Berat, Kaninë and Himarë
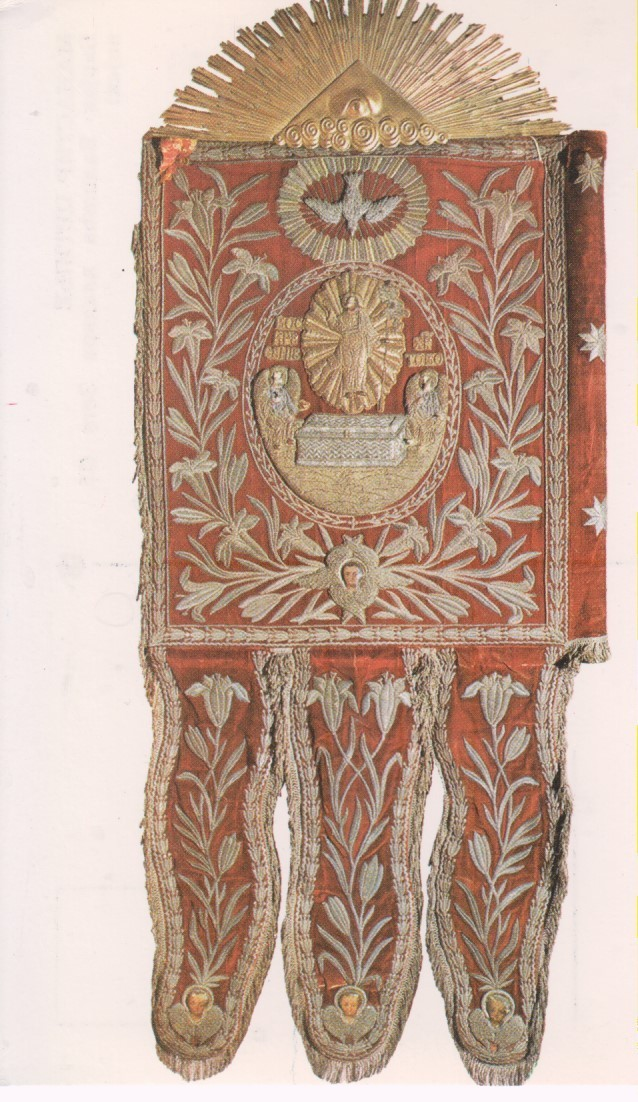
- Early 15th century banner of the Balšić noble family depicting the founder of the dynasty, Balša I and his sons: Đurađ I, Balša II and Stracimir

Lord of Zeta
- Reign: 1378 – 18 September 1385
- Predecessor: Đurađ I Balšić
- Successor: Đurađ II Balšić

Lord of Vlorë, Berat, Kaninë and Himarë
- Reign: 1372 – 18 September 1385
- Predecessor: Alexander Komnenos Asen
- Successor: Komnina or Comita Muzaka
- Died: 18 September 1385; Saurian field, near Lushnjë
- Spouse: Comita Muzaka (m. 1372)
- Issue: Ruđina Balšić
- Family: Balšić
- Father: Balša I
- Religion: Serbian Orthodox Church (until 1369) (from 1369) Roman Catholicism

Balša Balšić (Serbian Cyrillic: Балша Балшић; Albanian: Balsha II; died 18 September 1385) or Balša II was the Lord of Lower Zeta from 1378 to 1385. He was a member of the Balšić noble family, which ruled Zeta (with Scutari) from c. 1362 to 1421.

== Early life ==
Balša II was the youngest of three sons of Balša I. According to Mavro Orbini, Balša, the progenitor of the Balšić family, was a petty nobleman who held only one village in the area of Lake Skadar during the rule of Serbian Emperor Dušan the Mighty (r. 1331 to 1355). Only after the death of the emperor, during the subsequent weak rule of Emperor Uroš V, Balša together with his friends and his three sons (Stracimir, Đurađ and Balša II) gained power in Lower Zeta, which had previously been the lands of gospodin Žarko (fl. 1336 to 1360). Balša's people then turned for Upper Zeta, which was held by Đuraš Ilijić and his relatives; the Balšić brothers murdered Đuraš, and had some of his relatives imprisoned. Balša died the same year. Orbini further described the personalities of the brothers, claiming that Balša II was "good-natured and an accomplished horseman, but not of great mind". The Balšići managed to elevate themselves from petty nobility to provincial lords, becoming powerful after 1362, and it seems that they had an active part in the conflict between Emperor Uroš V and Simeon Uroš in Skadar, helping Uroš V.

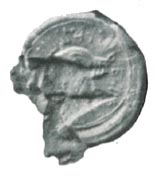
Seal of the Balšić brothers, January 17, 1368.

In the summer of 1364, the Balšić brothers were defeated in a skirmish against Karl Thopia. Đurađ I, brother of Balša II, was captured by Karl and was kept prisoner until 1366, when Dubrovnik mediated peace and procured his release. In January 1368, a Ragusan document reported that the three Balšić brothers: Stracimir, Đurađ I and Balša II, were preparing for a campaign against Karl Thopia. They were camped on the Mati River, which Karl's lands lay south of. The fighting was apparently small-scale as two months later, Karl had no difficulty capturing Dyrrhachium from the Angevins. In 1372, Balša II married Komnina, the daughter of the Despot John Komnenos Asen of Vlorë, Berat and Kaninë and the sister of his successor Alexander Komnenos Asen, or Comita, the daughter of Andrea II Muzaka, as later claimed by the Muzaka family chronicle, which considered the area part of its patrimony. Either way, Balša II's marriage secured him control of Vlorë, Berat and Kaninë by right of his wife, following the death of Alexander Komnenos Asen in 1371, solidified Balša's claim to the territories and ensured his support against mutual enemies like Marko.

== Reign ==
On January 13, 1378, Balša II came to power in Zeta after the death of his older brother, Đurađ I. His power was felt only in the region around Scutari and in the eastern part of Zeta's coast. The most prominent feudal lords who did not recognize Balša's rule were their sworn enemies, the Đurašević-Crnojević family, who were allies of the Republic of Venice.

In 1385, Balša II started the war for the conquest of Durazzo, taking it following four attempts. In 1385, the defeated ruler Karl Thopia appealed to Murat I for assistance, and the Ottoman Army led by Hajruddin Pasha routed the Balšići at the Battle of Savra, on the Saurian field, near Lushnjë. The Ottomans decapitated Balša and sent his head to Hajruddin Pasha as a gifth. This marks the end of the rule of his family over Durazzo.

== Aftermath ==
Balša's widow, Komnina or Comita, and their daughter Ruđina, later took control of Balša's territory in southern Albania to protect it from Ottoman invaders. Balša's widow seems to have been the Duchy of Valona's main ruler, until her death in 1396. In the meantime, the Muzaka family had gained control of Berat. In 1391, however, Ruđina married Mrkša Žarković. Žarković succeeded the duchy, calling himself Lord of Valona. He reigned over the city until his death in 1414. Ruđina took over her late husband's position and ruled Valona until 1417, when it, as well as its citadel in Kanina, was seized by the Ottomans. Ruđina fled Albania and sought asylum in Corfu. Her nephew, Balša III, then-ruler of Zeta, granted her asylum and entrusted her with governorship of the coastal town of Budva.

== Titles ==
His title was gospodin (lord), while after taking over Durazzo, he had the right to add the title of duke.

== Sources ==
- Fajfrić, Željko (2000) [1998], Sveta loza Stefana Nemanje (in Serbian), Belgrade: "Tehnologije, izdavastvo, agencija Janus", "Rastko".
- Fine, John Van Antwerp (1994), The Late Medieval Balkans: A Critical Survey from the Late Twelfth Century to the Ottoman Conquest, Ann Arbor: University of Michigan Press, ISBN 978-0-472-08260-5
- Sedlar, Jean W. (1994). East Central Europe in the Middle Ages, 1000–1500. Vol. III. Seattle: University of Washington Press. ISBN 0-295-97290-4.
- Veselinović, Andrija; Ljušić, Radoš (2008). Srpske dinastije. Službene glasink. ISBN 978-86-7549-921-3.

Balša II Balšić noble family Born: ? Died: 1385
Regnal titles
Preceded by Đurađ I	Lord of Lower Zeta; 1378–1385	Succeeded by Đurađ II
Preceded by Karl Topia	Duke of Durazzo; 1383–1385	Succeeded by Đurađ II
Preceded by Alexander Komnenos Asen	Duke of Valona and Kanina; 1372–1385; With: Komnina (jure uxoris)	Succeeded by Komnina
