= Blaz =

Blaz may refer to:

- Blaž, Bosnia and Herzegovina, a village near Višegrad

== Given name ==
- Blaž (given name), a masculine given name
- Blasius Mataranga (died 1377), Albanian nobleman

== Surname ==
- Tony Blaz (1958–2016), Guam politician
- Vicente T. Blaz (1928–2014), American Marine Corps officer
