= Gjon Mataranga =

Medieval Albanian Nobleman of the Mataranga family

Gjon Mataranga Gjon Matrënga
- Lord of Karavasta
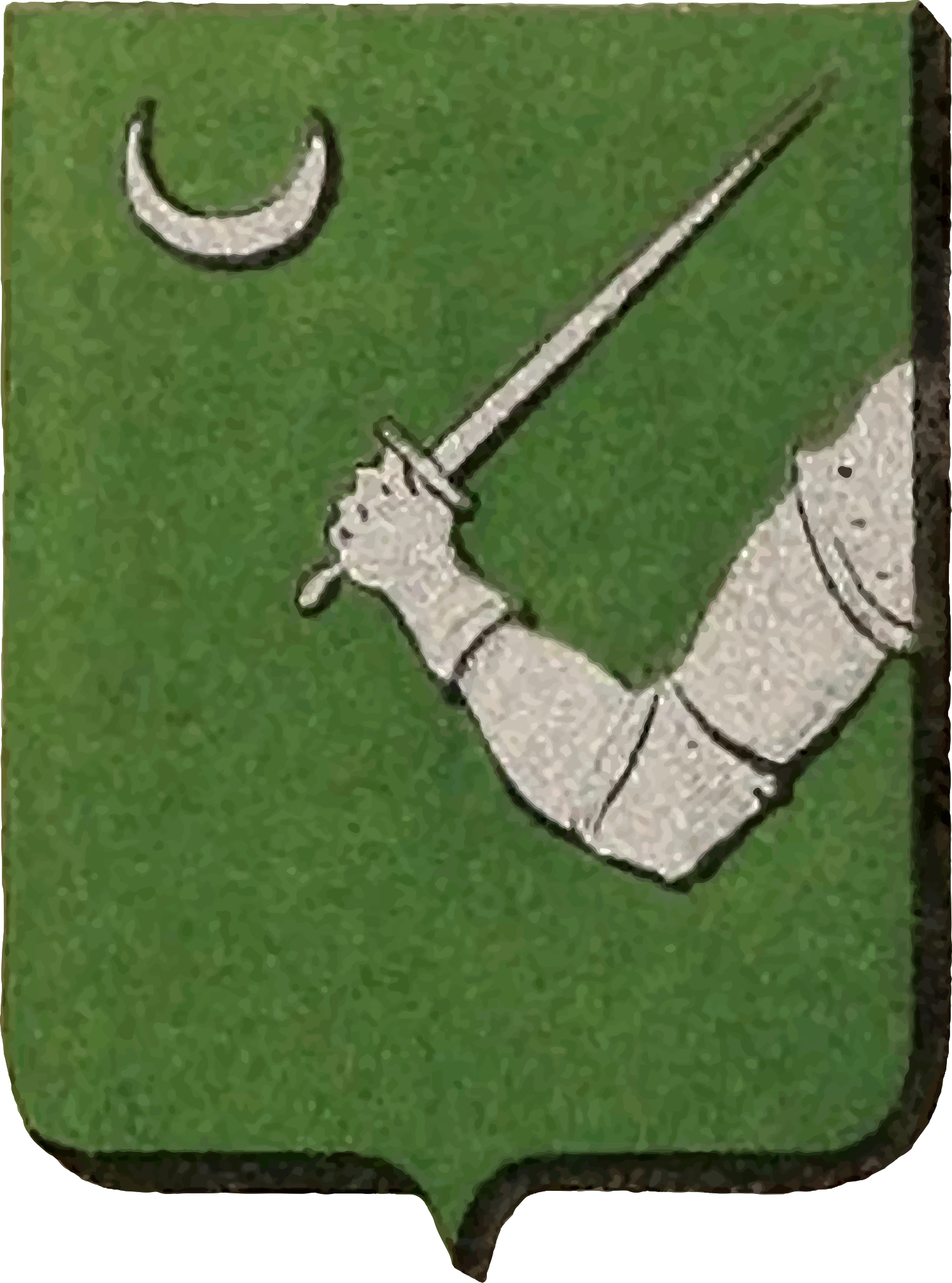
- Coat of Arms of the Mataranga family

Lord of Karavasta
- Tenure: 1367-13??
- Predecessor: Blasius Mataranga
- Born: 14th century
- Died: after 1386
- House: Mataranga
- Father: Blasius Mataranga
- Mother: Unknown

Gjon Mataranga (Albanian: Gjon Matrënga), also known as Gjoni, Johannes, Johan or John was an Albanian nobleman and member of the Mataranga family.

== Early life ==
Gjon was the son of Blasius Mataranga, an Albanian feudal lord who held the titles of Sevastocrator and Lord of Karavasta. The identity of his mother remains unknown, and not much is known about his early life.

From 1357 to 1367, his father governed the Principality of Mataranga located between the Shkumbin and Devoll rivers, with his administrative center likely based at Pirgu or the strategic Breg castle, also referred to as Vrego or Briego), which may have served as his primary stronghold. His father's territory flourished during his reign, particularly as a key trading center for grain exports, and was contested by the neighboring Thopia and Balsha families. However, after his father's death in 1367, much of his land was seized by rivals, and his family's influence began to decline.

== Later life and inheritance ==
Gjon inherited a small portion of his father's lands after his death, though these holdings were relatively modest in comparison to the principality's previous extent, and he inherited the same title as his father. Despite the challenges, Gjon remained involved in regional politics and continued to engage with surrounding powers, including the Republic of Ragusa. Gjon's name appears in several Ragusan documents from May 1386, including one dated May 11, 1386, where he was granted citizenship, a process commonly used for other nobles of the region. In another document from May 19, 1386, a gift of 50 ducats was recorded for Gjon, while another source indicates that he was given 100 ducats. His actions in the late 14th century reflect his continued engagement with the political and economic affairs of the region, even as the Mataranga family's power waned.

== Historiographical debate ==
According to Mavro Orbini, Gjon Mataranga and his father, Blasius Mataranga, were taken prisoner by the Balsha family after they violated a safe-conduct that had been granted to them. Despite a short-lived truce with the Balshas, who were pushing their expansion southward, Blasius was deceitfully captured and later perished in captivity. Gjon endured imprisonment for seventeen years before finally gaining his freedom and resurfacing in Dubrovnik in 1386. Historian John V. A. Fine challenges this version of events, arguing that Orbini was likely mistaken. Fine points out that the lands Orbini attributes to the Balsha, such as Berat and Kaninë, were actually acquired by Balsha II through marriage in 1372, rather than by conquest. If the Balsha family did take over any Mataranga holdings, Fine suggests it would have been their smaller possessions near the Bojana River rather than more significant territories in central Albania.

== See also ==
- Mataranga family

== Bibliography ==
- Akademia Shqiptare e Shkencave (2002). Historia e Popullit Shqiptar [History of the Albanian People] (in Albanian). Shtëpia Botuese "Toena".
- Dubaić, Nikola (2022). The Matarango Arbaneshi Family. Initial volume 10 [in Serbian], Centre for Advanced Medieval Studies, Belgrade.
- Fine, John V. A. (1994). The Late Medieval Balkans: A Critical Survey from the Late Twelfth Century to the Ottoman Conquest. University of Michigan Press. ISBN 978-0-4720-8260-5.
- Hoxha, Rifat (2005). Kavaja, kur nuk ishte dhe si u bë [Kavaja, when it wasn't there and how it became there] (in Albanian). Shtypshkronja "Gutenberg".
- Jireček, Konstantin (1911). Geschichte der Serben [History of the Serbs] (in German). Gotha: F.A. Perthes.
- Karaiskaj, Gjerak (2021). Fortifikimet e antikitetit të vonë dhe mesjetës në Shqipëri qytete, kala, fortesa, kështjella [Late Antiquity and Medieval Fortifications in Albania cities, castles, fortresses, castles] (in Albanian). Berk. ISBN 978-9-9284-6276-3.
- Malaj, Edmond (2022). "Marrëveshje dhe çështje të tjera ndërmjet Raguzës dhe fisnikëve arbërorë" [Agreements and Other Issues Between Ragusa and Albanian Nobles]. Studime Historike (in Albanian). Tirana: Instituti i Historisë, Akademia e Studimeve Albanologjike.
- Qeriqi, Ahmet (2023). The Stone of the Oath. novum pro Verlag. ISBN 978-1-6426-8417-9.
- Vlora, Ekrem bey (1956). Beiträge zur Geschichte der Türkenherrschaft in Albanien: eine historische Skizze [Contributions to the history of Turkish rule in Albania: a historical sketch] (in German).
