= Blaž =

Blaž may refer to:

- Blaž (given name), a masculine given name
- Blaž, Bosnia and Herzegovina, a village near Višegrad
