= Blasius Mataranga =

Albanian nobleman

Blasius Mataranga Vlash Matrënga
- Sevastokrator; Lord of Karavasta; Lord of Slanica; Sebastokrator, dominus ad ostium fluminis Vregi ("lord of the mouth of the Vrego River")
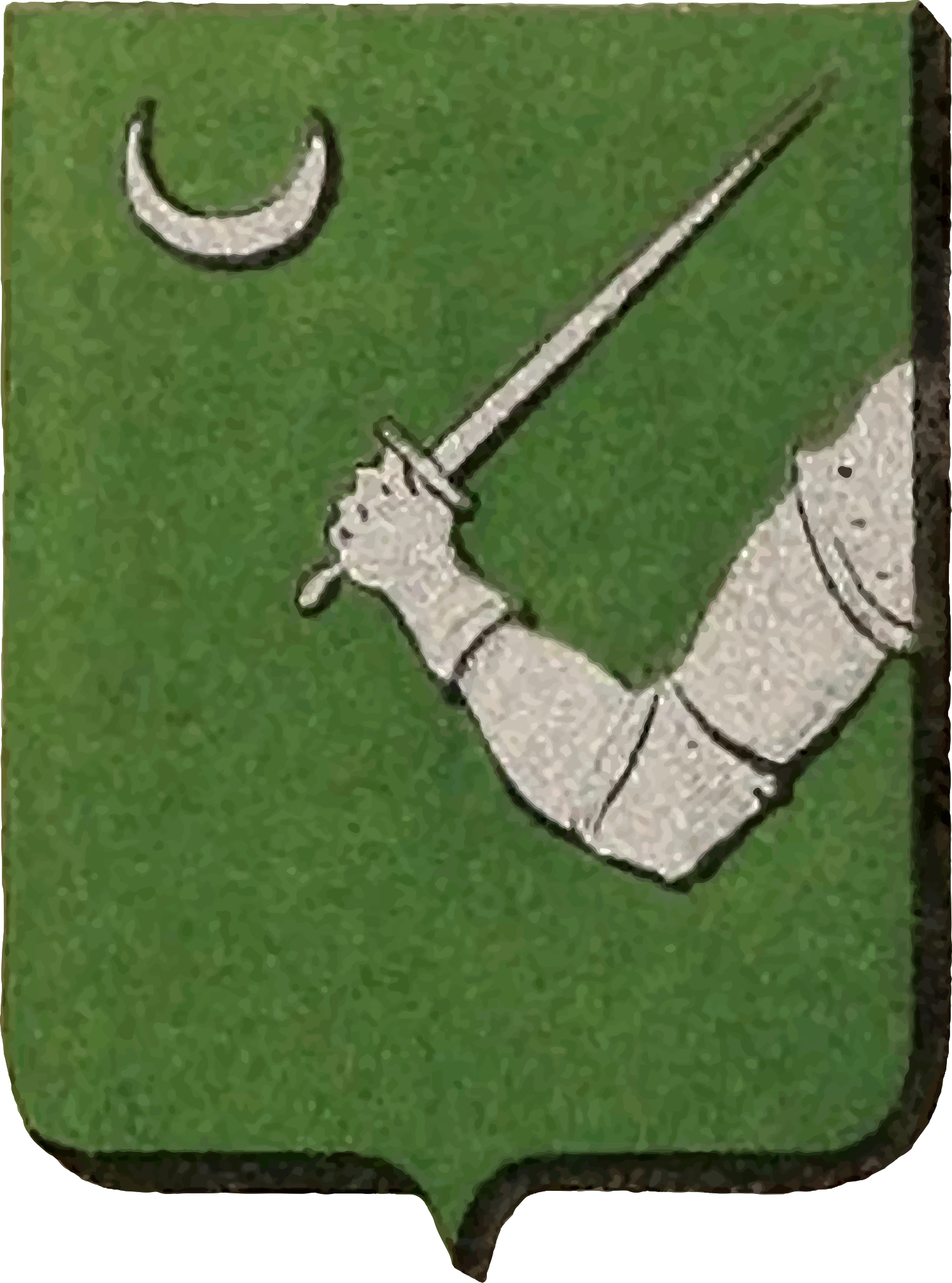
- Coat of Arms of the Mataranga family

Lord of Karavasta
- Reign: 1358–1367
- Successor: Gjon Mataranga (inherited small portion of his father's lands)
- Died: c. 1367
- Spouse: Unknown
- Issue: Gjon Mataranga
- House: Mataranga

Blasius Mataranga (Albanian: Vlash Matrënga; 13?? – 1367), also known as Blasius II, Blasii, Blasium, Blasio, Blaz, Blaxium, Vlasii, Vlasius, or Vlaxius was an Albanian nobleman and member of the Mataranga family. He played a key role in Albania's regional politics during the mid-14th century, being actively engaged in various power struggles among the local noble families and shaping the political and military landscape. Blasius ruled over the Principality of Mataranga from 1358 to 1367, with control over the coastal region between Durrës and Vlorë, including the strategic port of Karavasta. Blasius is referred to in sources as a lord a title that indicated his noble rank and authority, although he did not formally hold the title of prince despite ruling over a principality. He also held the title of sevastokrator, which was a senior Byzantine court title meaning August Ruler and was recognized by Simeon Uroš, the Serbian ruler who claimed the title of Emperor of Serbs and Greeks after the death of Stefan Dušan, the powerful Serbian emperor whose vast empire fragmented following his death.

Following this, Blasius asserted independent control over his territories. His principality, though short-lived, prospered as a trade center, particularly for grain. He used this economic base to strengthen his political position, and Ragusan archives show he frequently engaged in trade negotiations. Blasius was involved in conflicts with neighboring noble families, such as the Thopia and Balsha families, and maintained diplomatic relations with the Republic of Ragusa, focusing on trade agreements. Blasius died around 1367, possibly after being captured and imprisoned by the Balsha family, though the exact circumstances remain uncertain. Following his death, his lands were contested and absorbed by neighboring nobles, leading to the decline of the Mataranga family's influence.

His son, Gjon Mataranga, inherited part of his estate, but the Mataranga family soon disappeared from historical records. Blasius is regarded as the last prominent figure of the Mataranga family.

== Rise to power ==
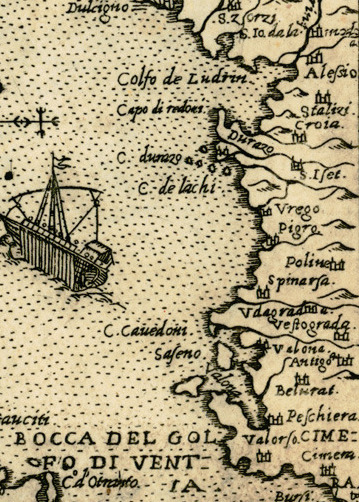
Detail from a 1574 map depicting the Adriatic coast of Albania, with the Castle of Vrego (Bashtovë Castle) and Pigro (Pirgu), the two likely administrative centers of Blasius, located between Durazzo (Durrës) and Valona (Vlorë).

Blasius was a member of the noble Mataranga family, which controlled territory in the coastal region between the powerful cities of Durrës and Vlorë, two of the most important urban and trade centers in medieval Albania. The Mataranga family had been established in the region since at least the early 14th century, maintaining influence through shifting political dynamics. The identity of his parents remains unknown, and little is recorded about his early life. Under Blasius Mataranga, the Mataranga family flourished, reaching the peak of its prosperity. This is demonstrated by Blasius's establishment of an independent principality between 1358 and 1367.

In 1343, the region encompassing the Mataranga family's territories came under Serbian control following Stefan Dušan's military campaigns in Albania. Following the death of Dušan on 20 December 1355, Blasius, who first emerged onto the political scene in the late 1350s, asserted control over the Myzeqe region through local alliances and the fragmenting of the Serbian Empire, established himself as a semi-autonomous ruler north of Vlorë, in the Myzeqe region, situated between the Shkumbin and Devoll rivers in central and Southern Albania. Blasius was semi-autonomous because he accepted the title of sevastokrator from Simeon Uroš, but he ruled his lands independently; he declared his independence and formed a short-lived principality that lasted from 1358 to 1367. Blasius held the title of sevastokrator, which was granted to him by Simeon Uroš, recognizing his authority over the territory. Blasius also held the title of Lord of Karavasta, a region situated between the mouths of the Shkumbin and Seman rivers. His Latin title was sebastokrator, dominus ad ostium fluminis Vregi (sebastokrator, lord of the mouth of the Vrego River). His administrative center was likely located at Pirgu (also known as Pirgo or Dies Carvastri), a coastal area situated between the Shkumbin and Seman rivers, historically described as a sandy beach with abundant trees and vines; or at the strategic Breg castle, (also known as Vrego or Briego), located near the mouth of the Shkumbin River, which may have served as his main stronghold. While under Blasius's control, the area developed as a key trade center, particularly for grain exports to the Republic of Ragusa (modern-day Dubrovnik), which was a key trading partner in the region.

== Territory and conflicts ==
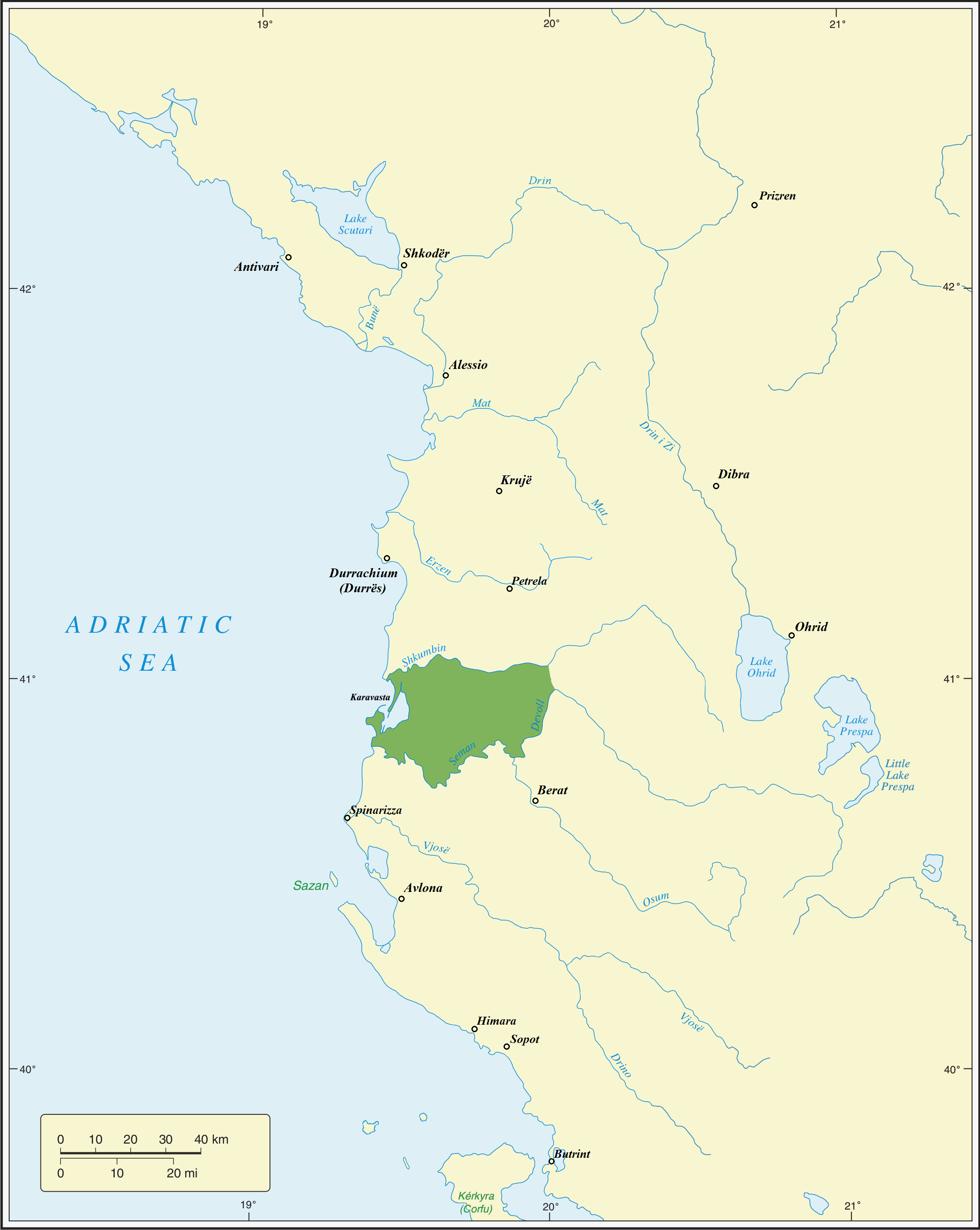
The Principality of Mataranga, ruled by Blasius (between 1358 and 1367)

The region between Lake Shkodër and Durrës was contested by three key families: the Balsha, the Mataranga, and Thopia, each of whom vied for control throughout the 14th century as the Serbian Empire weakened. The Thopia family was generally stronger compared to the Balsha and Mataranga families during the mid-14th century, while the Balsha family rose to greater prominence in the later decades of the century. The conflict between the families was shaped by shifting alliances, notably the strategic marriage of Karl Thopia to Voisava Balsha, sister of the Balsha lords Gjergj I Balsha, Strazimir Balsha, and Balsha II, as well as frequent disputes over key territories. The Mataranga family, in particular, had ongoing disputes with the Thopia family, especially over overlapping claims near the Shkumbin River.

Blasius controlled a significant portion of land on the coast, including the port of Karavasta, the Shkumbi River to the north, the Seman River to the south, and the Devoll River to the east. Since parts of the land included grazing areas for various tribes, the borders were not fixed. Parts of the land likely included grazing areas used by various tribes, some of which may have been allied with the Mataranga family. To the south of Mataranga lands lay the Principality of Vlorë, initially ruled by the Bulgarian nobleman John Komnenos Asen, who was Despot of Vlorë, and from 1363 by his son Alexander Komnenos Asen, who was Sebastos of Vlorë and Lord of Berat, Vlorë, and Kaninë. Both Blasius, John, and Alexander maintained ties with Ragusa and Simeon Uroš, indicating that they operated within a shared diplomatic and trade network. While to the north were the lands of the Thopia family who ruled the Principality of Albania. The lands of the Mataranga family bordered those of the Thopia family, with the Shkumbin River serving as a rough boundary between the two.

Montenegrin historical records imply that the Mataranga family might have gained possession of lands to the north, stretching from the Bunë river to Durrës. However, these territories are only vaguely described and overlapped with lands controlled by numerous other tribes and noble houses, making it hard to define clear borders. Although it is believed that the Mataranga acknowledged the authority of the Serbian tsar over these northern regions, there is evidence suggesting they maintained some level of independence.

During the 1363–64 Balsha–Thopia war, the Mataranga family allied with the Balsha. The war was part of a larger power struggle between the Balsha and Thopia families for control of central Albanian territories, especially the strategically important city of Durrës. This alliance suggests that, if the Matarangas were indeed attempting to establish control over northern territories, they may have been vassals or clients of the Balsha in that region. However, it is more likely that the Matarangas' involvement in the conflict stemmed from a dispute with the Thopia family to the south. This theory is supported by the fact that the citizens of Durrës backed the Thopias, possibly in response to Blasius Mataranga's attempt to seize the town. Karl Thopia defended Durrës and, during a skirmish in 1364, he captured Gjergj I Balsha, holding him until 1366 when peace was brokered by Dubrovnik. The capture of Gjergj I Balsha and the subsequent peace settlement indicate that Blasius and his allies suffered a significant defeat in the war. As a result, Blasius Mataranga’s position weakened considerably.

== Relations with Ragusa ==
=== Establishment ===
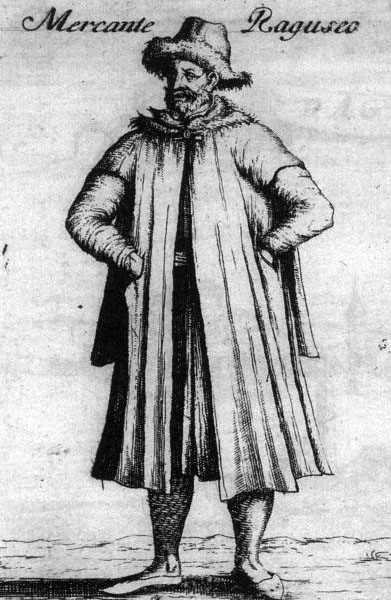
1708 depiction of a Ragusan merchant

The Republic of Ragusa, a maritime republic like Venice, centered on the powerful city of Dubrovnik, was a major hub of trade and diplomacy in the Adriatic region during this time. Its strategic location made it an important player in regional politics and commerce, especially in relation to local lords such as Blasius Mataranga. According to German scholar I. Mahnken, Blasius Mataranga's relationship with Ragusa began c. 1360, following multiple attempts at establishing communication. One such attempt occurred in 1359, when the Dubrovnik Grand Council, on 3 April 1359, approved sending a gift to Blasius Mataranga through one of their representatives, following instructions from the Council.

One significant document highlighting the relationship between Blasius Mataranga and the Republic of Ragusa is dated 22 October 1358. It is a decision by the Small Council of Ragusa that mentions an armed ship and letters that were to be given to Blasius Mataranga and two Ragusan men, Stepe de Giorgo and Niko de Mlaskanjas, who acted as commercial agents for Ragusa tasked with managing trade relations and transporting goods. The letters instructed these two Ragusans, Niko and Stepe, to return to Ragusa within six days using the same ship, unless Mataranga's news to the merchants was revoked. While the document does not clarify why all three were addressed together or the exact nature of the “news,” it suggests that Mataranga’s communications with Ragusan merchants influenced the timing of the agents’ return. However, the historical records do not specify the outcome of Stepe de Giorgo and Niko de Mlaskanjas’s mission.

In December 1358, it became known that one of the reasons for Ragusan presence in Blasius Mataranga’s territory was their authorization to export a specific quantity of dried pork (carne porcina) to Dubrovnik. The export came from the river ports of Shkumbin/Vrego or Devoll; he brief period of calm in Albania, following Simeon Nemanjić's defeat at Shkodër in the summer of 1358, helped stimulate the flow of goods and capital through the port cities of Albania. During the 1340s, Dubrovnik traders had shown growing interest in sourcing grain from the ports at the mouths of the Devoll and Vrego rivers, but the shifting political situation at the time required a new strategy for accessing these markets.

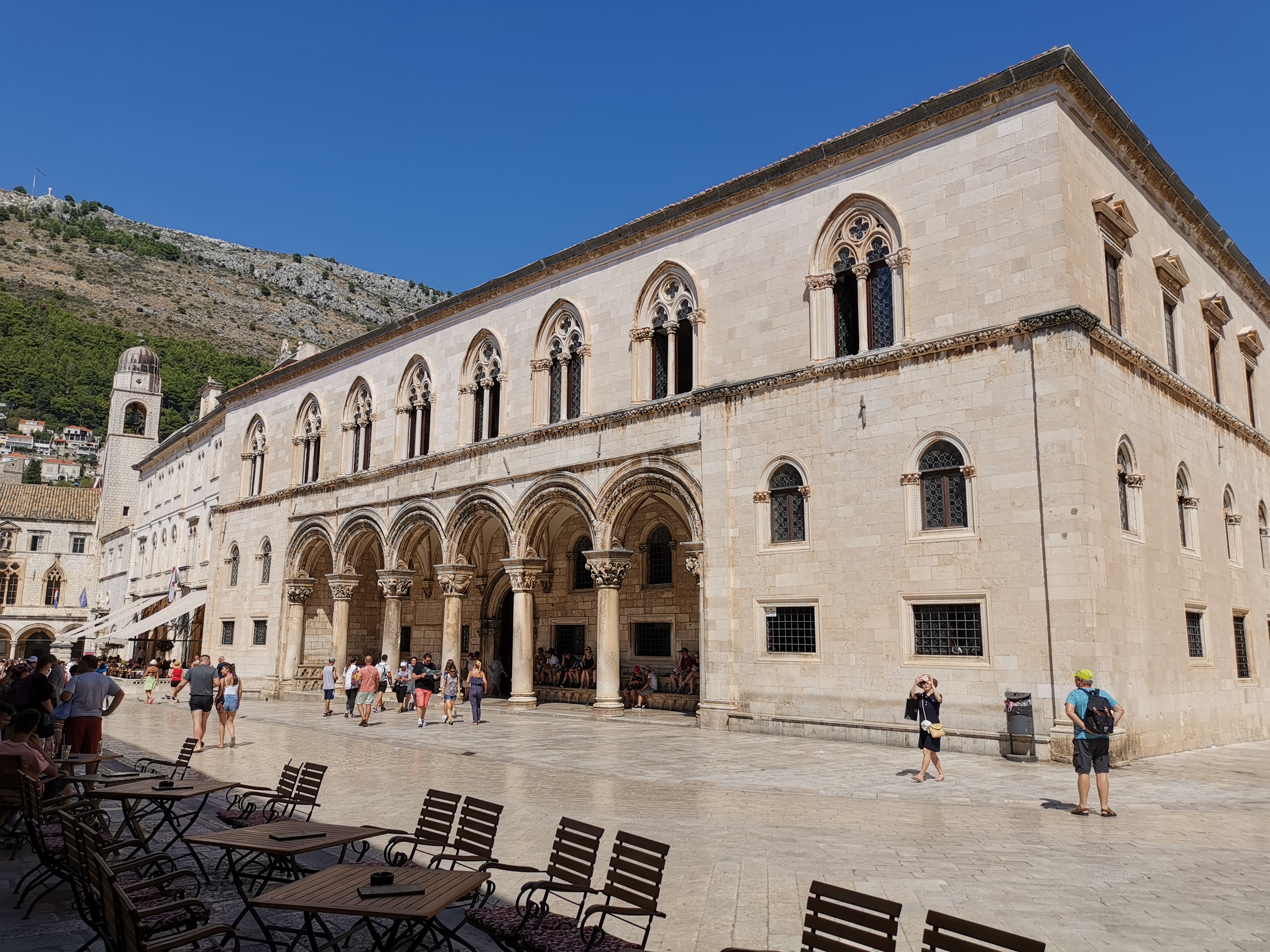
The Rector's Palace in Dubrovnik, the center of power for the Republic of Ragusa, where crucial decisions on trade and diplomacy, including those involving Blasius Mataranga, were made.

In an effort to maintain peaceful relations and secure their trade interests, Dubrovnik officials used diplomatic gifts to local rulers, both loyal and disloyal to the legitimate Serbian emperor.

The commercial agreements between Blasius and the Ragusan merchants, which concluded around 1360, were primarily centered on the trade of grain; however, the Ragusan merchants also transported other goods, including pork. These negotiations are confirmed through documents from the period of March to April 1360. On 17 March of that year, the Council of Ragusa unanimously decided to send a representative to Blasius Mataranga, accompanied by a gift of 55 ducats (a form of currency), with the additional possibility of procuring grain from the Briego region. This envoy was tasked with not only visiting Mataranga in Vrego but also traveling to areas such as Devoll (Yevalum) and Pulia. The envoy's primary mission was to secure grain and address other assigned matters. If the envoy failed to begin the journey, he would face a fine of 50 perper. The mission across these areas was expected to last two months, and the envoy was provided with a ship and 35 perper for the journey; the chosen representative for this mission was the Ragusan nobleman Dobre de Mençe. These details are found in documents issued by the Republic of Ragusa in March 1360. However, Ragusa sent ambassadors to Blasius Mataranga again in April 1360 and this time, the envoy selected was the noble Georgius de Bodaça, who was allocated a boat, an assistant, and a salary of 25 perper.

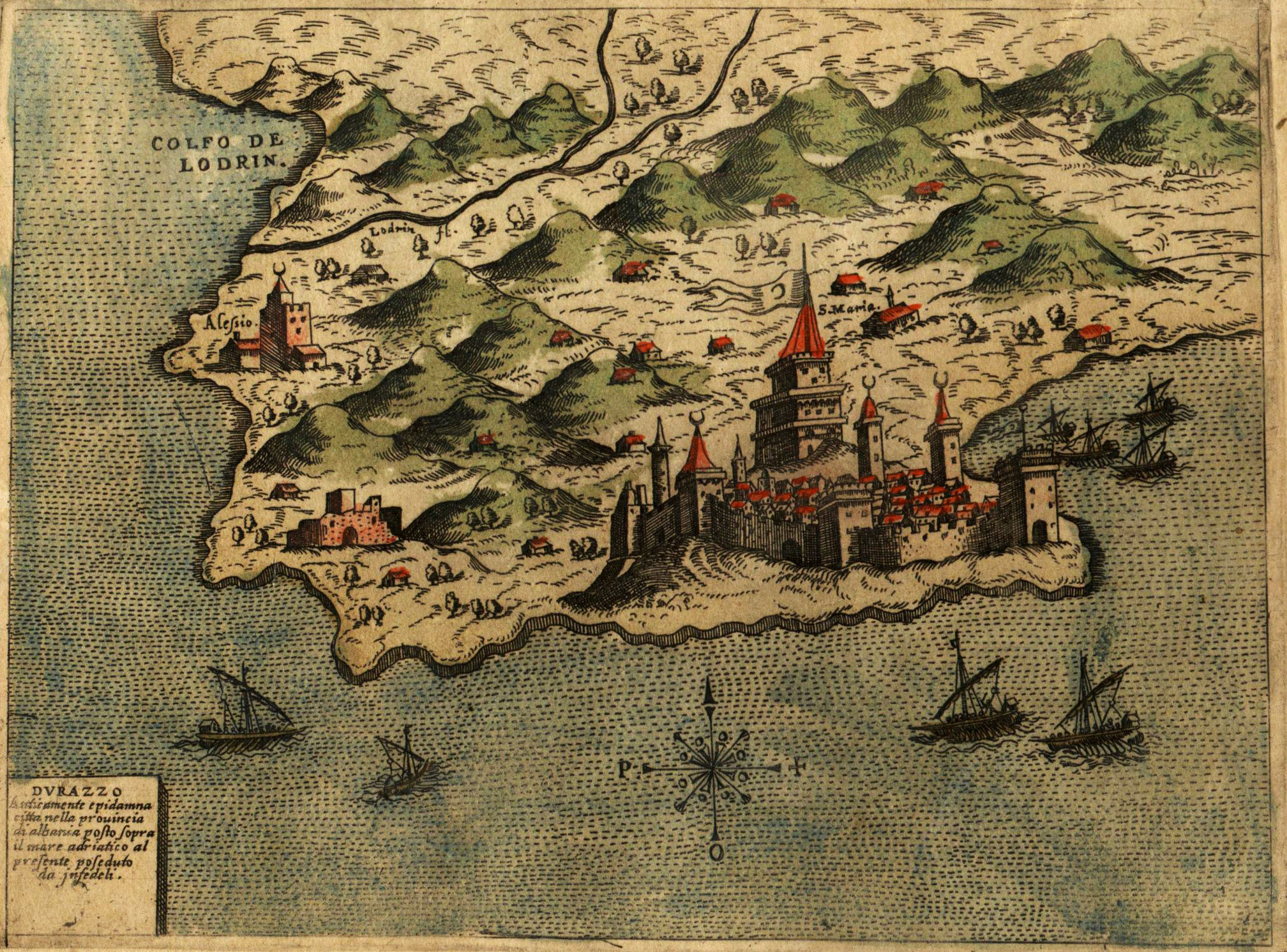
Map of Durrës in 1573

=== Mediation ===
Blasius also mediated between Ragusa and the city of Durrës. However, Ragusa itself also acted as a mediator between Blasius and Durrës, as tensions had arisen between them around 1360. To negotiate peace and understanding between Blasius and the people of Durrës, the Small Council of Ragusa sent an ambassador, Nicolaus de Grede, to both Blasius and Durrës. He was paid a salary of 50 perper, with additional funds for the boat rental and horses. If he refused the mission, he was required to pay a fine of 100 perper.

During this period, Ragusa's diplomatic efforts intensified. Initially, Dobre de Mençe was selected as the representative to Blasius Mataranga, but he was replaced by Žore (George) Budačić, possibly reflecting Ragusa’s desire to appoint more experienced envoys amid escalating tensions. In addition, Nicholas Gredić was appointed as a mediator to negotiate peace between Blasius Mataranga and the Anjou forces in Durrës. Ragusa placed great importance on these diplomatic missions, as seen in the severe penalties outlined for any envoy who failed to pursue peace efforts. The conflict was largely local in nature, involving occasional skirmishes and raids, and the role of the increasingly powerful Thopia family in the conflict remains unclear—whether they were fighting alongside or against the forces in Durrës is not definitively known. Although the conflict between Blasius and Durrës was primarily localized, it had significant repercussions on Ragusa's trade interests, as illustrated by the 1363 incident where Ragusa authorities seized a ship purchased from Blasius, which had been previously stolen by the lord of Slanica from a Durrës citizen.

The issues between Durrës and the Mataranga family that Ragusa sought to mediate were related to the fact that, during this period, the Mataranga territories had been attacked by Karl Thopia, who ruled over Durrës at the time. In addition to these negotiations, agreements were made with Blasius Mataranga to halt reprisals against Ragusan merchants.

=== Conflicts ===
Relations between Ragusa and Blasius Mataranga deteriorated in 1362. In May of that year, the Ragusan representative, Nico Mlaskonjić, was sent to protest the capture of Ragusan merchants by Blasius Mataranga and demand the return of their confiscated property. Historian Rade Mihaljčić connects this incident to the ongoing Ragusa–Serbia conflict, which had been initiated by Vojislav Vojinović. Mihaljčić argues that, during this period, Blasius remained loyal to the legitimate Serbian emperor, and points to key events as evidence. One such indication was the imprisonment of Ragusan merchants during the war with Serbia. Furthermore, in March 1363, a Ragusan envoy, Paskoje Ranjina, informed the authorities in Durrës that the Reka region was under the control of the "Emperor of Slavonia". This area extended from the Bunë River in the north to the Vjosa River in the south.

By the end of 1363, relations between Blasius Mataranga and Ragusa had improved. The same Ragusan envoy who had previously negotiated the release of captured merchants and their goods in 1362, Nico Mlaskonjić, was now preparing to export meat and grain from Blasius's territory. Blasius controlled an important trade region, including river ports at the mouths of the Shkumbin and Devoll rivers, which had long served as key supply points for Ragusan merchants. Throughout the 14th century, grain exports from this area were frequent, and dried pork was also traded in some years, including 1358 and 1363. The nearby port of Spinarica, despite its reputation as a pirate stronghold, remained strategically significant, prompting the Venetians to establish a consul there as early as 1276, followed by Ragusa in the early 14th century.

=== Final years ===
In a November 1364 document from Ragusa, several individuals linked to a certain "Sevastokrator" Blasius are mentioned, including Nicolaus de Bube, Theodorus Angello de Thessalia, and Menche Cheliot. They were paid 200 ducats by the Ragusan government as part of a debt repayment to Blasius for millet(mileum) he had sold. This raises the question of who the "sebastocrator" Blasius was. Some scholars, such as Barisha Krekić, believe it refers to Blasius Mataranga, while others, like Šuflaj, suggest it more likely refers to the lord of Slanica.

On 28 April 1365, Blasius conducted a transaction in which he sold millet to the city of Dubrovnik for 371 ducats. This sale was carried out through his envoys, Angelus de Teodoro de Dievali (from Devol) and Mençe Cheliot (also known as Chirioto). In this transaction, he is referred to as Vlasius Matarango or Vlaxius Matarango.

By the end of 1366, Blasius Mataranga faced renewed issues regarding the disruption of Dubrovnik merchants' operations. However, these problems were quickly resolved, as by March 1367, he resumed his cooperation with the Dubrovnik merchants, continuing to export grain from his territory. Midway through 1367, unspecified problems arose once again with Dubrovnik merchants Stefan Đorđije and Niko Buba. This was the last time Blasius Mataranga appeared alive in Dubrovnik's records.

== Death and decline ==
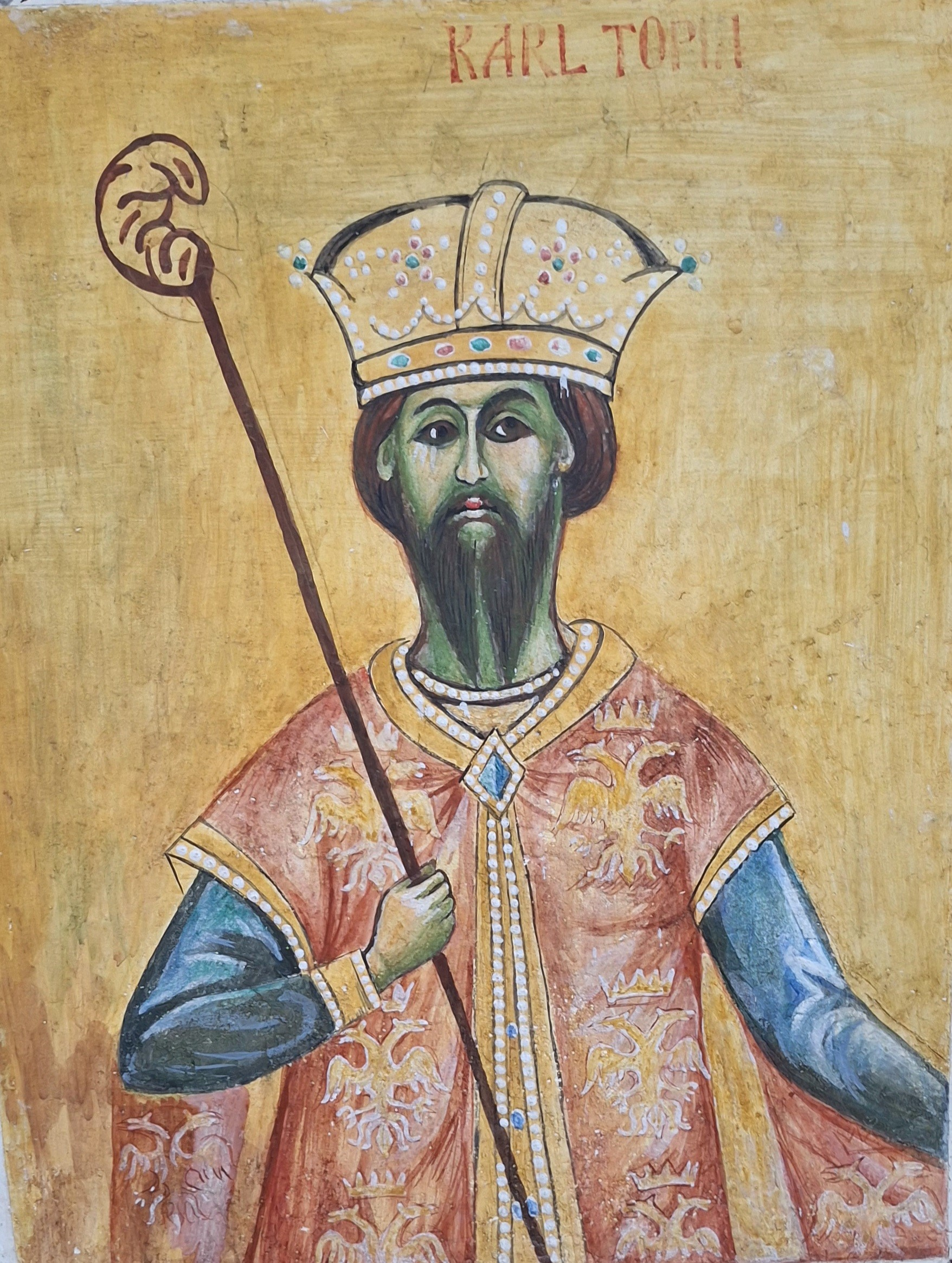
Karl Thopia

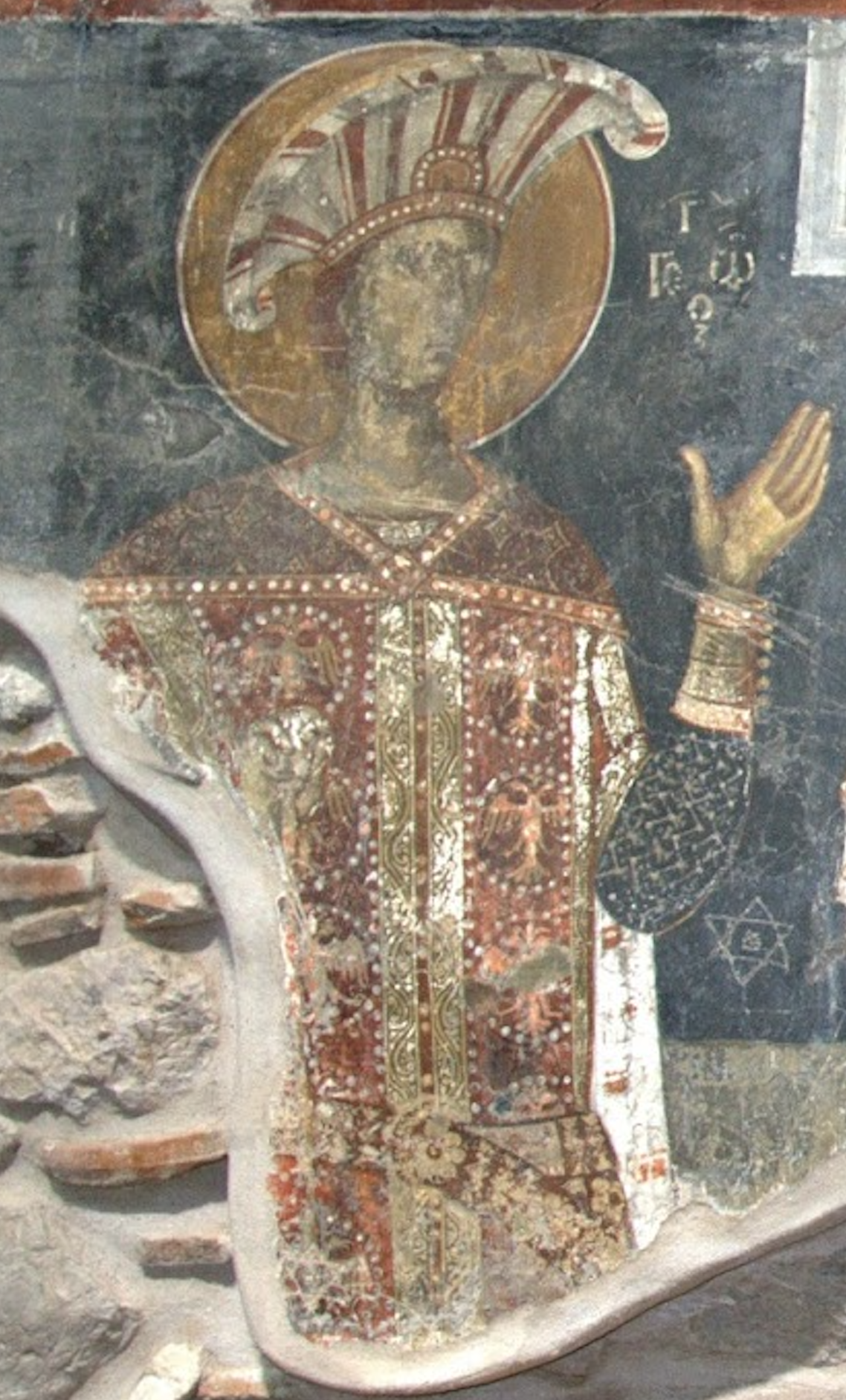
Andrea II Muzaka

Blasius Mataranga died in 1367 (or possibly 1369, according to some sources), with Orbini claiming he was killed by the Balshas. After his death, Karl Thopia was able to seize much of his lands, most likely those south of the Shkumbi River. However, some sources dispute this and suggest that the Muzaka or Balsha families may have acquired Blasius Mataranga's lands. Another source, based on an account describing Andrea II Muzaka's territorial expansion in the late 1360s, indicates that Andrea seized lands that had once belonged to Blasius, such as the important Breg Castle and territories along the Shkumbin River, such as Gosa and Garunja. This expansion brought him into direct conflict with the powerful Prince of Albania, Karl Thopia. This source also suggests that Karl Thopia took Blasius Mataranga's lands from the Muzakas.

A portion of the Mataranga holdings appear to have passed to Blasius's son, Gjon, who inherited the same title as his father. Following Blasius's death, the Mataranga family lost its influence in Albanian affairs, and by the early 1370s, they had vanished from historical records.

The relationship between Ragusa and the Mataranga family continued even after Blasius' death, with his son, Gjon Mataranga, taking over. Gjon's name appears in several documents from May 1386. On 11 May 1386, the Republic of Ragusa granted him citizenship, following the same process used for other nobles. Another document from 19 May 1386, mentions a gift of 50 ducats to Gjon Mataranga, while another source indicates that he was given 100 ducats.

== Historiographical debate ==
According to one source, during the period of Blasius Mataranga's downfall, the Balsha family was also involved in a campaign against Karl Thopia, around 1367/1368. Mataranga's role in this conflict, and potentially his demise as a consequence of it, remains unconfirmed. With his marriage to the noblewoman Comita Muzaka and Blasius's capture around 1370, Balsha II likely annexed Mataranga's lands to his newly acquired territories in the south, concentrated in Vlorë, Kaninë, and Berat.

According to Orbini, Blasius Mataranga and his son Gjon Mataranga were seized by the Balsha family after the Balshas violated a promise of safe conduct, after negotiating a brief truce with the Balshas, who were expanding southward. Blasius was captured by trickery and imprisoned, where he died. His son remained imprisoned for 17 years, only being released and reappearing in Dubrovnik in 1386. Blasius fell victim to the Balsha family's treachery, marking his downfall around 1369. Some historians have suggested that the Balsha acquired most of the Mataranga lands after violating this safe-conduct; Historian John V. A. Fine challenges this version of events, arguing that Orbini was likely mistaken, as the lands he attributes to the Balsha, such as Berat and Kanina, were actually obtained by Balsha II as part of his marriage dowry in 1372. Despite the Matarangas' involvement in the region between Berat and Kanina, these territories appear to have remained under the control of John Komnenos Asen and his son Alexander Komnenos Asen, not the Matarangas. If any land did pass to the Balsha, it would likely have been the Matarangas' smaller northern holdings near the Bunë River.

== Family ==
Blasius Mataranga's wife is not known, but the couple had one child. Gjon Mataranga inherited a small part of his father's lands following his death, including the same title as his father.

== See also ==
- Mataranga family

== Notes ==
1. Different surname variations include: Matarango, Matranga, Matarangolo, Matracca, Matarangi, Matrënga, and Matrangolo (with Matrënga being the Albanian spelling).
2. The title of Lord of Slanica is associated with a sevastokrator named Blasius. Scholar Šuflaj argues this refers to a local lord distinct from Blasius Mataranga, while Bariša Krekić suggests the sevastokrator could indeed be Blasius Mataranga himself. Therefore, if Blasius is the sevastokrator mentioned in the documents, it follows that he would also be the Lord of Slanica.
3. See Historiographical debate section
4. (at tractandum pacem et concordiam inter Duracenos et Blasium Mataragno)

== Bibliography ==
- Akademia Shqiptare e Shkencave (2002). Historia e Popullit Shqiptar [History of the Albanian People] (in Albanian). Shtëpia Botuese "Toena".
- Angelov, Dimiter (2007). Imperial Ideology and Political Thought in Byzantium, 1204-1330. Cambridge University Press. ISBN 978-0-5218-5703-1.
- Buxhovi, Jusuf (2020). MACEDONIA (From Antiquity to Our Time) (PDF). Jalifat Publishing.
- Dubaić, Nikola (2022). The Matarango Arbaneshi Family. Vol. 10. Centre for Advanced Medieval Studies, Belgrade.
- Elsie, Robert (2003). Early Albania A Reader of Historical Texts, 11th-17th Centuries. Harrassowitz. ISBN 978-3-4470-4783-8.
- Fine, John V. A. (1994). The Late Medieval Balkans: A Critical Survey from the Late Twelfth Century to the Ottoman Conquest. University of Michigan Press. ISBN 978-0-4720-8260-5.
- Hoxha, Rifat (2005). Kavaja, kur nuk ishte dhe si u bë [Kavaja, when it wasn't there and how it became there] (in Albanian). Shtypshkronja "Gutenberg".
- Instituti i Historisë (Akademia e Shkencave e RPS të Shqipërisë) (1987). Studime historike Volume 41 [Historical studies Volume 41] (in Albanian). Akademia e Shkencave, Instituti i Historisë.
- Jireček, Konstantin (1911). Geschichte der Serben [History of the Serbs] (in German). Gotha: F.A. Perthes.
- Jireček, Konstantin; Radonjić, Jovan (1952). ИСТОРИЈА СРБА Превео ЈОВАН РАДОЊИЋ ПРВА КЊИГА ДО 1537. ГОДИНЕ (Културна историја) Друго исправљено и допуњено издање [History of the Serbs Translated by Jovan Radonjić The First Book: Until 1537 (Cultural History) Second Corrected and Amended Edition] (PDF) (in Serbian). Издавачко предузеће народне републике Србије.
- Karaiskaj, Gjerak (2021). Fortifikimet e antikitetit të vonë dhe mesjetës në Shqipëri qytete, kala, fortesa, kështjella [Late Antiquity and Medieval Fortifications in Albania cities, castles, fortresses, castles] (in Albanian). Berk. ISBN 978-9-9284-6276-3.
- Malaj, Edmond (2022). "Marrëveshje dhe çështje të tjera ndërmjet Raguzës dhe fisnikëve arbërorë" [Agreements and Other Issues Between Ragusa and Albanian Nobles]. Studime Historike (in Albanian). Tirana: Instituti i Historisë, Akademia e Studimeve Albanologjike.
- Prifti, Leonard (2010). Shqiptarët, grekët dhe serbët kundër Shuflait [Albanians, Greeks and Serbs against Shuflai] (in Albanian). Shtëpia Botuese "Uegen". ISBN 978-9-9280-3018-4.
- Qeriqi, Ahmet (2023). The Stone of the Oath. novum pro Verlag. ISBN 978-1-6426-8417-9.
- Šufflay, Milan (2012). Serbs and Albanians Their Symbiosis in the Middle Ages. GPX Alerion LLC. ISBN 978-0-9887-1292-8.
- Vlora, Ekrem bey (1956). Beiträge zur Geschichte der Türkenherrschaft in Albanien: eine historische Skizze [Contributions to the history of Turkish rule in Albania: a historical sketch] (in German).
