= Vlahović =

Vlahović (Serbian Cyrillic: Влаховић) is a surname, a patronymic of Vlaho. Notable people with the surname include:

== Arts and entertainment ==
- Helga Vlahović (born 1945), Croatian journalist, producer, and television personality
- Jugoslav Vlahović (born 1949), Montenegrin artist and illustrator
- Tyler Vlahovich (born 1967), American artist

== Football ==
- Dušan Vlahović (born 2000), Serbian footballer
- Neđeljko Vlahović (born 1984), Montenegrin football coach and former footballer

== Politics ==
- Miodrag Vlahović (politician, born 1961) (born 1961), Montenegrin politician
- Veljko Vlahović (1914–1975), Montenegrin politician and army officer
- Miodrag Vlahović (politician, born 1924) (born 1930), President of the Presidency of the Socialist Republic of Montenegro 1984–85

== See also ==
- Vlaović
