= Blažić =

Blažić (Cyrillic script: Блажић) or Blažič is a South Slavic surname, derived from the masculine first name Blaž, a form of the name Blaise. It may refer to:

- Antun Blažić (1916–1943), Croatian Jewish Partisan
- Borka Jerman Blažič, Slovenian computer scientist and internet pioneer
- Branislav Blažić (1957–2020), Serbian surgeon and politician
- Dragoljub Blažić (1936–1991). Yugoslav footballer
- Larisa Blazic (born 1970), British video installation artist and academic
- Jaka Blažič (born 1990), Slovenian basketball player
- Marko Blažić (born 1999), Croatian water polo player
- Marko Blažić (born 1985), Serbian footballer
- Miha Blažič (born 1980), Slovenian musician and songwriter, known by the stage name N'toko
- Miha Blažič (born 1993), Slovenian footballer
- Milena Mileva Blažić (born 1956), Slovenian literary historian and professor
- Sergio Blažić (1951–1987), Croatian hard rock musician
- Srđan Blažić (born 1982), Montenegrin football player
- Uroš Blažić (born 2002), prime suspect for the 2023 Mladenovac and Smederevo shootings
- Viktor Blažič (1928–2014), Slovenian journalist, essayist, translator and former anti-Communist dissident
