= Principality of Mataranga =

Medieval Albanian principality (1358–1367)

Principality of Mataranga Principata e Matarangës (Albanian)
- 1358–1367
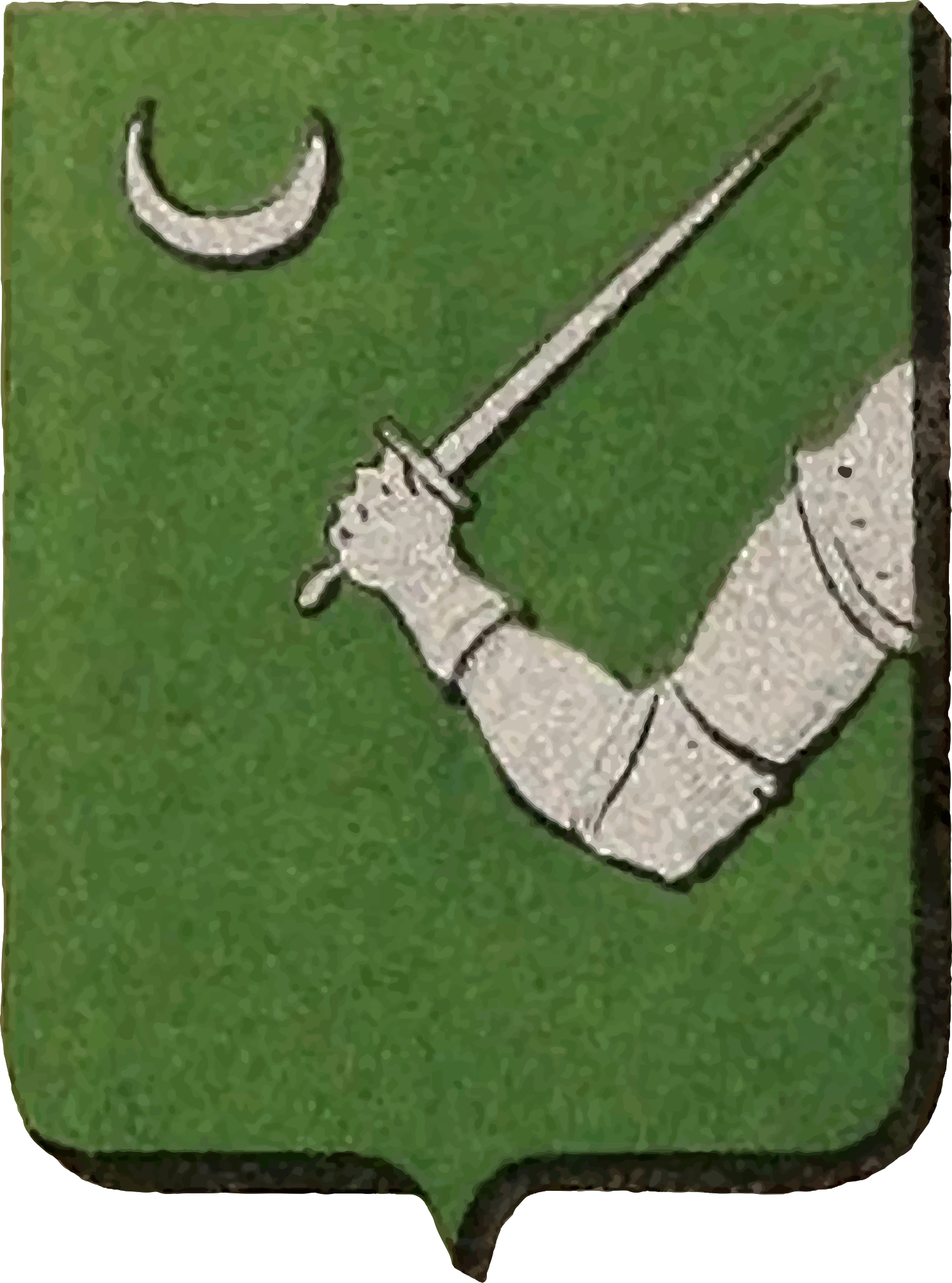
- Coat of arms of the Mataranga family

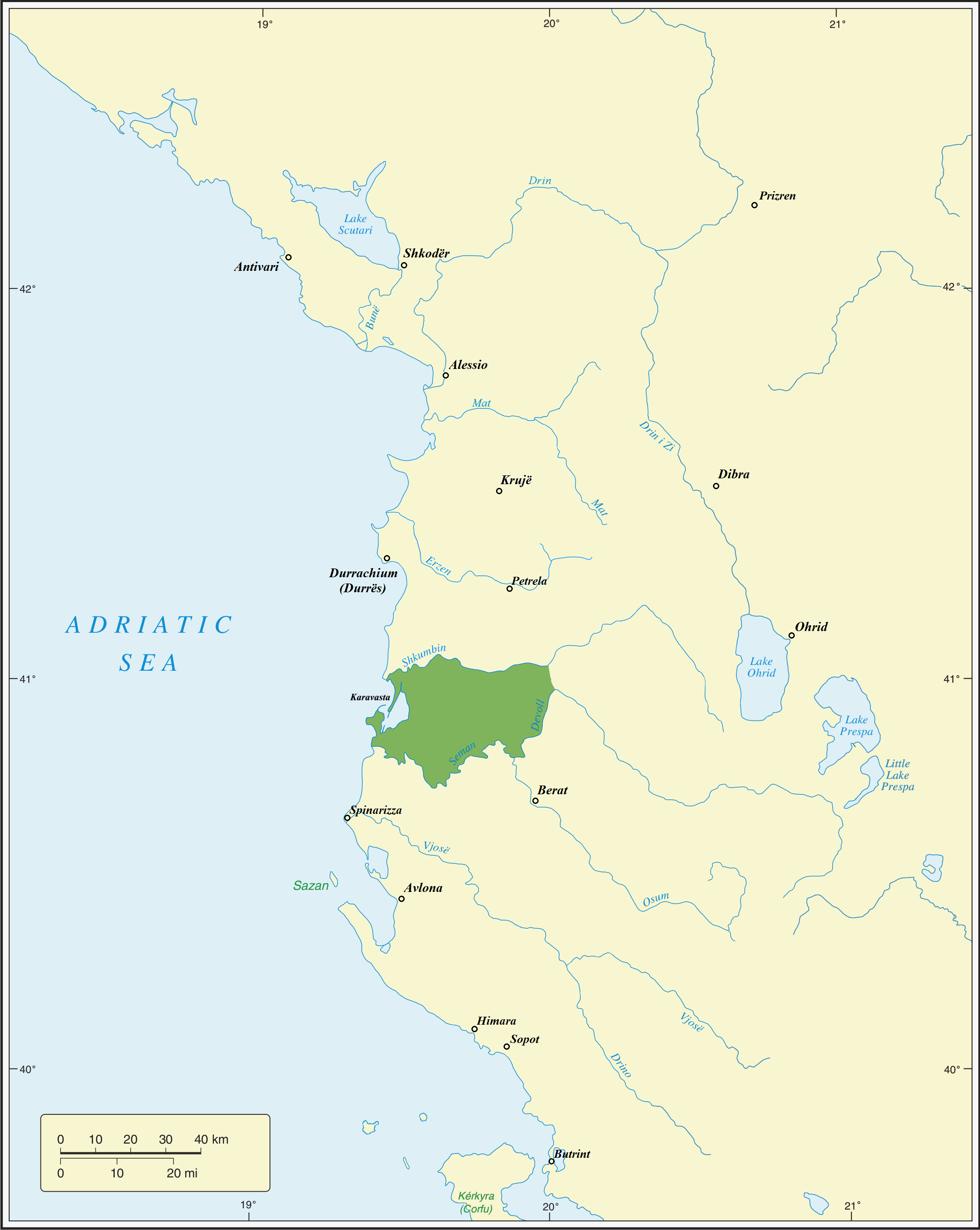
- The Principality of Mataranga between 1358 and 1367
- Status: Principality
- Capital: Pirgu or Breg, historically known as Vrego/Briego)
- Common languages: Albanian
- Religion: Eastern Orthodoxy, Roman Catholicism
- Sevastokrator & Lord of Karavasta
  - 1358–1367: Blasius Mataranga
  - 1367-1367: Gjon Mataranga
- Historical era: Medieval
  - Established: 1358
  - Thopia–Muzaka takeover: 1367
| Preceded by | Succeeded by |
| Serbian Empire | Principality of Albania (medieval); Principality of Muzaka |
- Today part of: Albania

The Principality of Mataranga (Albanian: Principata e Matarangës; 1358–1367) was a short-lived medieval Albanian principality located between the Shkumbin and Seman rivers, in what is today the Myzeqe region of southwestern Albania. Initially under the overlordship of the Serbian Empire, the principality emerged following the empire's decline after the death of Stefan Dušan in 1355. Ruled by Blasius Mataranga, a member of the notable Mataranga noble family, the principality maintained de facto independence during this period, with diplomatic and trade relations with the Republic of Ragusa. It lasted until 1367, when much of its territory was absorbed by the neighboring Principality of Albania, ruled by the Thopia family, and the Principality of Muzaka, ruled by the Muzaka family.

== History ==
=== Development ===
The Principality of Mataranga was established in the mid-14th century by Blasius Mataranga, a member of the influential Mataranga noble family. The principality was situated along the southwestern Albanian coast between the Shkumbin and Seman rivers, encompassing strategic areas such as the port of Karavasta and the surrounding fertile lands of Myzeqe. Blasius rose to prominence amid the fragmentation of the Serbian Empire following the death of Emperor Stefan Dušan in 1355. Although initially under Serbian overlordship, Blasius asserted independent rule over his territories between 1358 and 1367.

=== Reign of Blasius ===
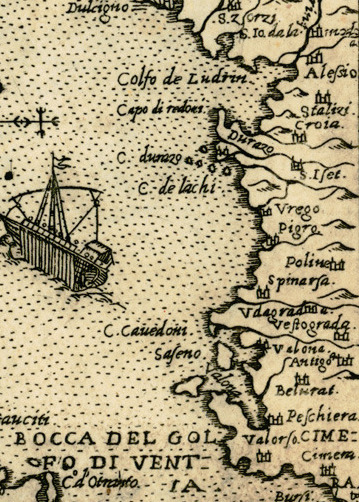
1574 map depicting the coast of Albania, with the Castle of Vrego (Bashtovë Castle) and Pigro (Pirgu), the two likely capitals of Blasius.

Blasius held the Byzantine court title of sevastokrator, granted by Simeon Uroš, a Serbian ruler who styled himself Emperor of Serbs and Greeks. This title acknowledged Blasius's authority but did not restrict his practical independence. He also held the title Lord of Karavasta. His capital was probably either at Pirgu (also called Pirgo or Dies Carvastri), a coastal area between the Shkumbin and Seman rivers known historically for its sandy beaches and lush vegetation, or at the strategically positioned Breg Castle (also referred to as Vrego or Briego) which is situated near the mouth of the Shkumbin River and may have functioned as his main stronghold. The borders of the principality were fluid, as the surrounding areas were home to various Albanian tribes whose loyalties shifted frequently, and land control overlapped with neighboring noble families. Despite this, Blasius managed to assert effective control over a significant stretch of territory bounded roughly by the Shkumbin River in the north, the Seman River to the south, and extending inland toward the Devoll River. Some sources also suggest that the Matarangas may have held smaller or secondary lands further north, between the Bunë River and Durrës, though these holdings were likely limited and contested, possibly held as vassals under the Balsha family. Under his leadership, the principality flourished as a trade hub, particularly in grain exports, establishing important commercial links with the maritime Republic of Ragusa (modern-day Dubrovnik).

=== Military conflicts and alliances ===
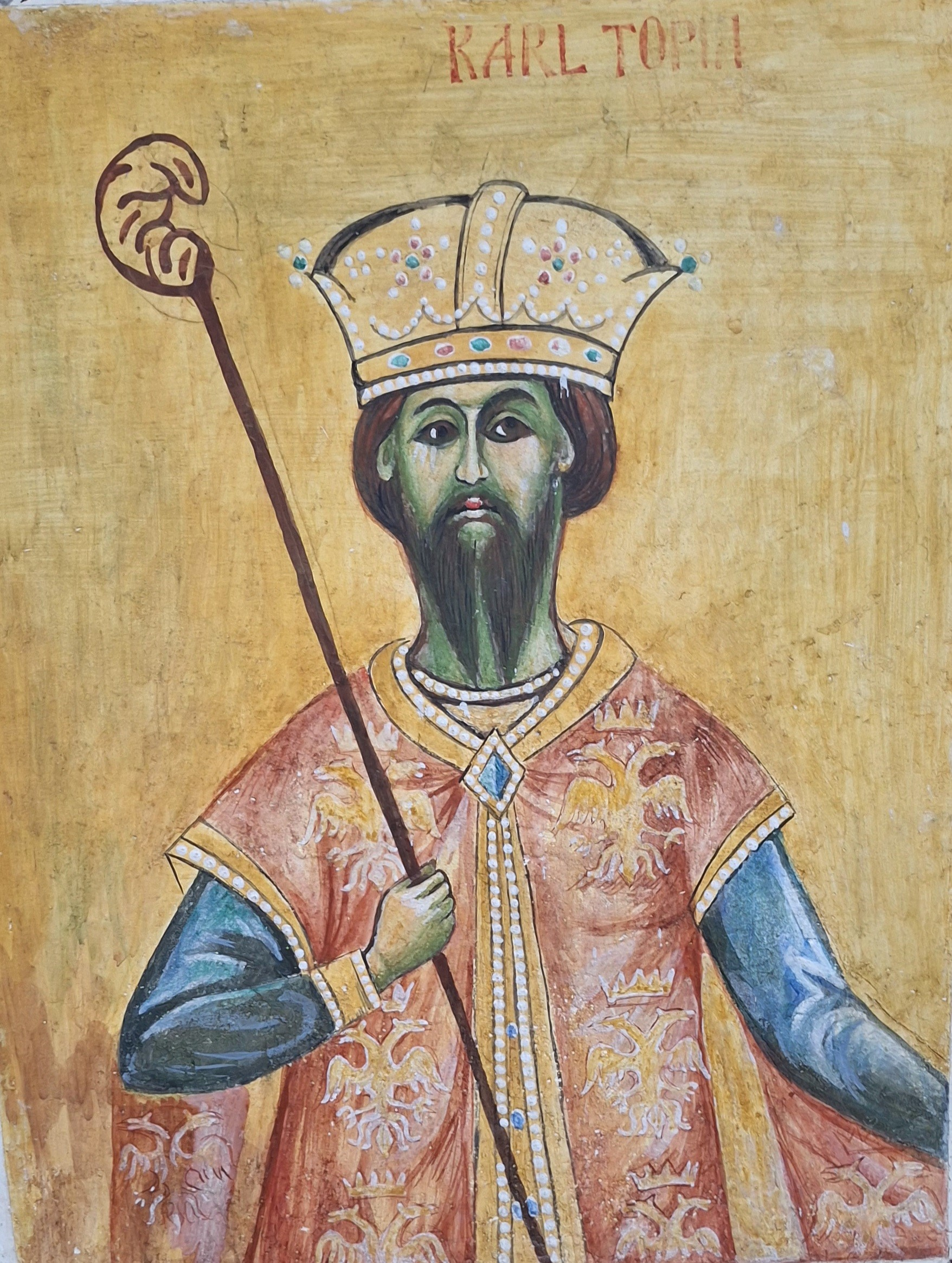
Karl Thopia

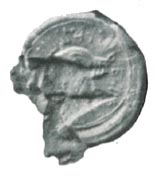
Seal of the Balsha family

Blasius's reign was dominated by ongoing conflicts with rival noble houses vying for dominance in central Albania. Most notable were the tensions with the powerful Thopia family, rulers of the Principality of Albania. The principality also had fluctuating relations with the Balsha family, rulers of the Principality of Zeta, sometimes allying with them against common enemies.

During the mid-1360s, these rivalries erupted into open battle in what is known as the 1363–64 Balsha-Thopia War. The Mataranga family allied with the Balshas during the 1363-64 conflict against the Thopias. This war centered largely on control of strategic territories and ports, particularly Durrës, which was closely contested by surrounding nobles. Blasius likely attempted to extend his influence toward Durrës, prompting defensive action from Karl Thopia, who successfully resisted these incursions. In the spring of 1364, during a skirmish, Karl Thopia captured Gjergj I Balsha and held him prisoner until 1366, when the Republic of Ragusa (Dubrovnik) mediated a peace agreement that secured his release.

=== Economic activity and relations with Ragusa ===
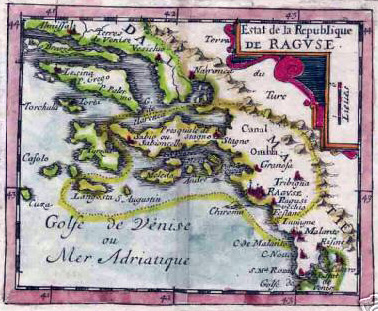
Map of the Republic of Ragusa.

The principality under Blasius was an important regional trade hub. Its fertile plains produced abundant grain, which was exported via the ports along the coast, especially Karavasta and the river mouths of the Shkumbin and Devoll rivers. These exports contributed to the regional trade economy and were among the agricultural goods imported by the Republic of Ragusa (modern-day Dubrovnik), a maritime republic that maintained active commercial ties along the Adriatic coast.

Diplomatic correspondence and trade records from Ragusa attest to frequent negotiations with Blasius, focusing on securing safe passage and favorable terms for grain and other commodities, including dried pork. Ragusan envoys were regularly dispatched to his court, often bearing gifts to maintain amicable relations and protect commercial interests. Ragusa also played a mediating role in local conflicts involving the principality, particularly disputes with the city of Durrës and its rulers.

These economic ties provided Blasius with the resources and political leverage to sustain his principality amid the region's fractious environment. However, the principality's prosperity was vulnerable to the shifting tides of war and the ambitions of neighboring lords.

=== Decline and legacy ===
Blasius Mataranga's death around 1367-possibly at the hands of the Balsha family, according to some sources-marked the beginning of the principality's rapid decline. With his passing, the Mataranga family lost its grip on power, and much of their territory was absorbed by neighboring noble houses, particularly the Thopias and Muzakas. His son, Gjon Mataranga, retained a small portion of the family's former lands but appeared only sporadically in historical records and failed to restore their prominence. By the early 1370s, the Mataranga name had largely faded from the political scene, bringing an end to the principality's brief but notable role in Albanian medieval history.

== Rulers ==
| Picture | ^{Title}Name | Reign | Notes |
|---|---|---|---|
| | ^{Sevastokrator & Lord of Karavasta} Blasius Mataranga | 1358–1367 | Founder of the Principality of Mataranga. Ruled independently between 1358 and 1367 with the title sevastokrator granted by Simeon Uroš. Established his capital at Pirgu or Breg Castle and developed the principality into a regional trade hub, exporting grain to Ragusa. His reign ended with his death around 1367, after which the principality rapidly declined. |
| | ^{Lord of Karavasta} Gjon Mataranga | 1367-1367 | Son of Blasius Mataranga. Inherited a diminished portion of his father's principality after 1367 and held the title Lord of Karavasta. Though unable to restore the family's former power, he remained active in regional politics. |

== See also ==
- Mataranga family
- Blasius Mataranga
- Gjon Mataranga

== Bibliography ==
- Akademia Shqiptare e Shkencave (2002). Historia e Popullit Shqiptar [History of the Albanian People] (in Albanian). Shtëpia Botuese "Toena".
- Angelov, Dimiter (2007). Imperial Ideology and Political Thought in Byzantium, 1204-1330. Cambridge University Press. ISBN 978-0-5218-5703-1.
- Buxhovi, Jusuf (2020). MACEDONIA (From Antiquity to Our Time) (PDF). Jalifat Publishing.
- Dubaić, Nikola (2022). The Matarango Arbaneshi Family. Vol. 10. Centre for Advanced Medieval Studies, Belgrade.
- Elsie, Robert (2003). Early Albania A Reader of Historical Texts, 11th-17th Centuries. Harrassowitz. ISBN 978-3-4470-4783-8.
- Fine, John V. A. (1994). The Late Medieval Balkans: A Critical Survey from the Late Twelfth Century to the Ottoman Conquest. University of Michigan Press. ISBN 978-0-4720-8260-5.
- Hoxha, Rifat (2005). Kavaja, kur nuk ishte dhe si u bë [Kavaja, when it wasn't there and how it became there] (in Albanian). Shtypshkronja "Gutenberg".
- Instituti i Historisë (Akademia e Shkencave e RPS të Shqipërisë) (1987). Studime historike Volume 41 [Historical studies Volume 41] (in Albanian). Akademia e Shkencave, Instituti i Historisë.
- Jireček, Konstantin (1911). Geschichte der Serben [History of the Serbs] (in German). Gotha: F.A. Perthes.
- Karaiskaj, Gjerak (2021). Fortifikimet e antikitetit të vonë dhe mesjetës në Shqipëri qytete, kala, fortesa, kështjella [Late Antiquity and Medieval Fortifications in Albania cities, castles, fortresses, castles] (in Albanian). Berk. ISBN 978-9-9284-6276-3.
- Malaj, Edmond (2022). "Marrëveshje dhe çështje të tjera ndërmjet Raguzës dhe fisnikëve arbërorë" [Agreements and Other Issues Between Ragusa and Albanian Nobles]. Studime Historike (in Albanian). Tirana: Instituti i Historisë, Akademia e Studimeve Albanologjike.
- Prifti, Leonard (2010). Shqiptarët, grekët dhe serbët kundër Shuflait [Albanians, Greeks and Serbs against Shuflai] (in Albanian). Shtëpia Botuese "Uegen". ISBN 978-9-9280-3018-4.
- Qeriqi, Ahmet (2023). The Stone of the Oath. novum pro Verlag. ISBN 978-1-6426-8417-9.
- Šufflay, Milan (2012). Serbs and Albanians Their Symbiosis in the Middle Ages. GPX Alerion LLC. ISBN 978-0-9887-1292-8.
- Vlora, Ekrem bey (1956). Beiträge zur Geschichte der Türkenherrschaft in Albanien: eine historische Skizze [Contributions to the history of Turkish rule in Albania: a historical sketch] (in German).
