= Blažević =

Blažević is a common Croatian last name, originating from the masculine first name Blaž, a form of the name Blaise.

It is one of the most common surnames in three counties of Croatia.

It may refer to:

- Anamarija Blažević (born 1979), Croatian politician
- Ante Blažević (born 1996), Croatian football player
- Davor Blažević (born 1993), Croatian-Swedish football player
- Goran "Šiljo" Blažević (born 1986), Croatian football player
- Igor Blaževič (born 1963), Czech human rights campaigner of Bosnian Croat origin
- Ivan Blažević (born 1992), Croatian football player
- Jakov Blažević (1912–1996), Croatian politician during Yugoslavia
- Miroslav "Ćiro" Blažević (1935–2023), Croatian football manager of Bosnian Croat origin
- Roko Blažević (born 2000), Croatian singer
- Stjepan Blažević (1942–2025), Bosnian footballer
- Valentina Blažević (born 1994), Croatian handball player
- Vlatko Blažević (born 1994), Croatian football player
