= Blaž (given name) =

Blaž is a masculine given name found in Slovenia, Croatia and Croats of Bosnia and Herzegovina. It is cognate to Blaise. It has male variants Blažo, Blaže and Blaženko, as well as female variant Blaženka.

Croatian variant Vlaho is specific to Dubrovnik, whose patron saint is sveti Vlaho (st. Blaise).

In Croatia, it was the most common in the inter-war period (1930s) and geographically in the Northwest Croatia, with two biggest cities Zagreb and Split having most bearers. It is found as early as of 1664, in parish records of the Catholic Church in Croatia.

It may refer to:

- Blaž Arnič, Slovenian composer
- Blaž Blagotinšek, Slovenian handball player
- Blaž Božič, Slovenian football player
- Blaž Brezovački, Slovenian football player
- Blaž Cof, Slovenian canoeist
- Blaž Črešnar, Slovenian basketball player
- Blaž Emeršič, Slovenian hockey player
- Blaž Furdi, Slovenian cyclist
- Blaž Gregorc, Slovenian hockey player
- Blaž Jakopič, Slovenian skier
- Blaž Janc, Slovenian handball player
- Blaž Jarc, Slovenian cyclist
- Blaž Kocen, Slovenian geographer and cartographer
- Blaž Kavčič, Slovenian tennis player
- Blaž Kavčič (politician), Slovenian politician and economist
- Blaž Kraljević, Bosnian Croat military leader
- Blaž Lenger, Croatian singer
- Blaž Lomovšek, Slovene hockey player who played for Yugoslavia
- Blaž Lorković, Croatian economist and lawyer
- Blaž Mahkovic, Slovenian basketball player
- Blaž Medvešek, Slovenian swimmer
- Blaž Mesiček, Slovenian basketball player
- Blaž Mikuž, Slovenian astronomer
- Blaž Puc, Slovenian football player
- Blaž Rola, Slovenian tennis player
- Blaž Samerl, Slovene politician
- Blaž Slišković, Bosnian Croat football manager and player
- Blaž Škrinjarić, Croatian notary and judge
- Blaž Trupej, Slovenian tennis player
- Blaž Vrhovec, Slovenian football player
- Blaž Vrhovnik, Slovenian ski jumper
- Blaž Zbičajnik, Slovenian football player
- Blaž Zupan, Slovenian computer scientist

== See also ==
- Surnames: Blaž, Blažić, Blažević
