= Vlaović =

Vlaović is a surname. Notable people with the surname include:

- Goran Vlaović (born 1972), Croatian footballer
- Milana Vlaović (born 1971), Croatian journalist, composer, writer, and columnist

== See also ==
- Vlahović (disambiguation)
