= Mataranga family =

Albanian noble family

Matranga or Matranxhi Matrëngajt
- Noble family
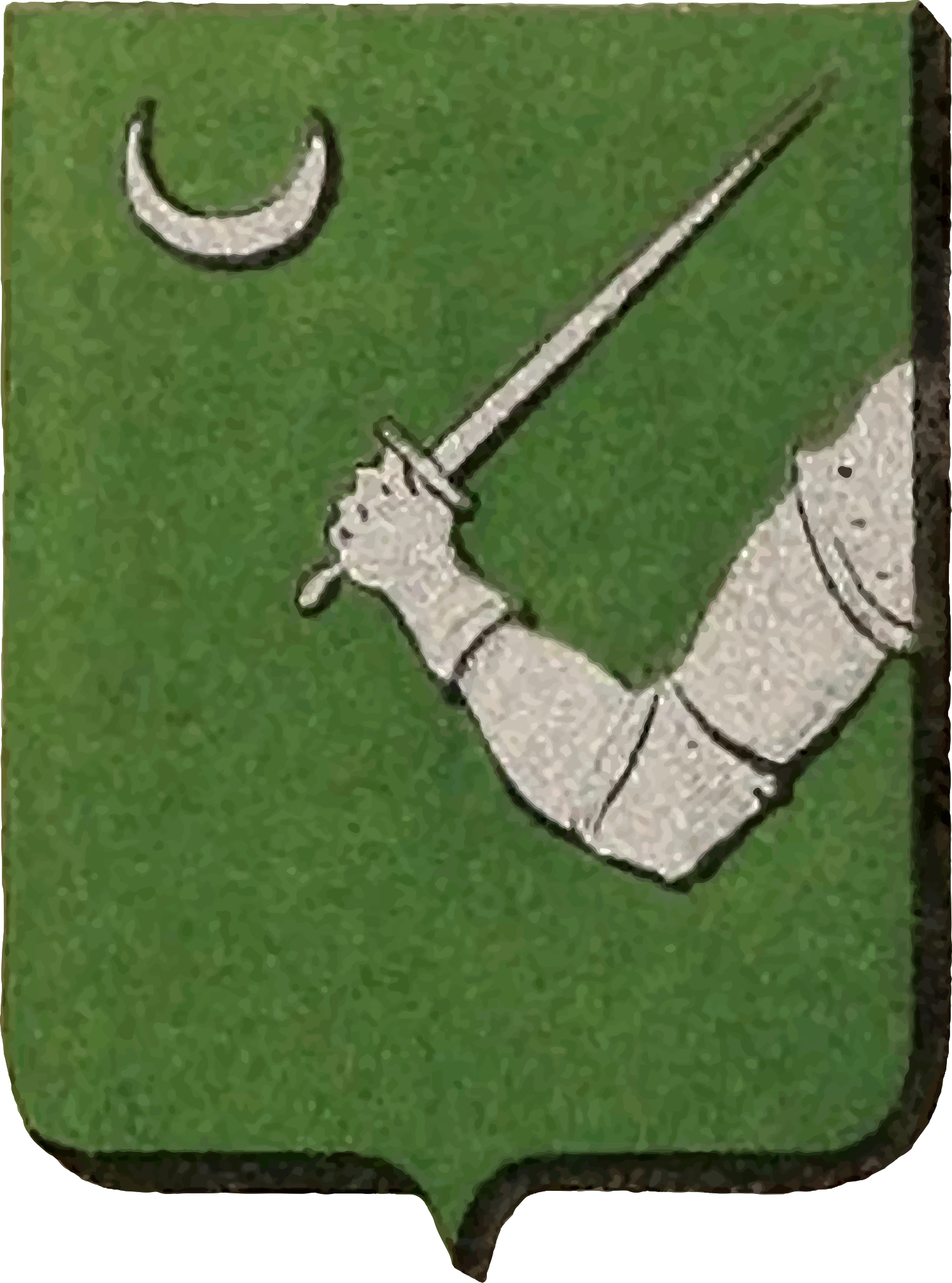
- The coat of arms of the Matranga is found in the 1875 heraldic catalog titled "Il Blasone in Sicilia", published in Palermo by Visconti & Huber.
- Country: Medieval Albania
- Founded: 13th century
- Members: Paul I Mataranga; Euphemia Mataranga; Blasius Mataranga; Gjon Mataranga; Giovanni Mataranga; Giacomo Mataranga; Luca Matranga
- Estates: fiefdoms of Morgana and Mantica
- Dissolution: 1513; 513 years ago
- Different spellings of the name include Matranga, Matranxhi,Matarangolo, Matracca, Matarangi, Matrënga.

The Matranga, Matranxhi or Matrangolo (Matrënga in Albanian) were an Albanian noble family during the 13th and 15th centuries which ruled the Principality of Mataranga. Members of this family included local rulers, Byzantine officials and writers. After the occupation of Albania by the Ottoman Empire, part of the family emigrated to Italy and settled in the Arbëresh villages of Piana degli Albanesi and Santa Cristina Gela in Southern Italy, where they have continued to maintain the Arbëresh language. Part of the Matranga family that remained in Albania during the Ottoman Empire had their last names changed from Matranga to Matranxhi, a common routine the Ottoman Empire implemented in order to erase the identities of those they occupied. Many of the descendants of the noble Matranga family today go by the last name Matranxhi. The Matranga lineage was prevalent to building the kingdom of Albania as well as being one of the biggest crime families in America before Al Capone.

== History ==
Before 1284, the Matranga family was either a vassal of Charles of Anjou, in the period when he created Kingdom of Albania, or of his nephew Philip of Taranto. They were first documented in 1297 in a Ragusian document. Members of the Matranga family were attacking Ragusian merchants in the region of Karavasta Lagoon. Rulers of the territory between the cities of Durrës and Vlorë, they were described as subjects to the Byzantine Emperor at the time. The Matranga family might have become vassal of the Byzantine Emperor in the period between 1284 and 1288, when the region, which was part of the Kingdom of Albania, was captured by the Byzantine Empire. However they eventually threw off their allegiance with Byzantines and eagerly accepted the Angevin overlordship again in 1304, when Philip of Taranto recaptured Durrës with the help of local Albanian noblemen.

During this period members of the family were also active in the Byzantine administration. A person named Mataringides, who had a part in a plot against Andronikos II Palaiologos, is mentioned as a student of Manuel Moschopoulos and led to his imprisonment for Manuel has taken a pledge for his student. Another member of the family, Nicholas Matarangos, became one of the four general judges, member of the highest imperial court and had a prominent role in the Byzantine civil war of 1341–1347.

After the oath of allegiance to Philip of Taranto, the Matrangas continued to maintain close ties with the Angevin family. The advancing Kingdom of Serbia was a source of continuous preoccupation. A certain Paul Mataranga is mentioned in 1319, together with other Albanian lords, in a coalition with Philip of Taranto against Stefan Milutin. However their territories were eventually included in the Kingdom of Serbia before 1343.

After the death of Stefan Dušan (1355), a member of the family, Blasius Matarango (al. Vlash Matranga), subsequently ruled over the Principality of Mataranga which was between the Shkumbin and Seman as sevastokrator between 1358 and 1367, recognized under the suzerainty of Simeon Uroš. Dubrovnik was especially keen to maintain good relations with Blasius as his lands were a source of grain that was valuable to Dubrovnik merchants but this did not prevent a breakdown in 1360 during the war between Dubrovnik and Serbia. Mihaljčić, the Serbian historian, can see no other explanation for this other than the continued vassalage of Blasius to Serbia.

== Members ==
- (possibly) Matarangides (fl. 1305), possibly from Dyrrhachion, a student of Manuel Moschopoulos who took part in the plot against Andronikos II Palaiologos which led to his imprisonment.
- Nicholas Matarango (fl. 1341–47), one of four general judges, member of the highest imperial court, who had a prominent role in the Byzantine civil war of 1341–1347.
- Paul I Mataranga (fl. 1319).
- Euphemia Mataranga, (Albanian : Efimia/Efthimia), married to Andrea II Muzaka with whom she had 5 children.
- Blasius Mataranga.
- Gjon Mataranga, son of Blasius.
- Luca Matranga
