= Divjakë-Karavasta National Park =

National park in western Albania

- Parku Kombëtar Divjakë-Karavasta
- IUCN category II (national park)
- Official logo

- Location within Albania Location within Europe
- Location: Fier County
- Nearest town: Divjakë
- Coordinates: 40.923913°N 19.494403°E
- Area: 22,389.08 hectares (223.8908 km^{2})
- Designated: 19 October 2007
- Governing body: National Agency of Protected Areas

Ramsar Wetland
- Official name: Karavasta Lagoon
- Designated: 31 October 1995
- Reference no.: 781

Divjakë-Karavasta National Park (Albanian: Parku Kombëtar Divjakë-Karavasta) is a national park in western Albania, sprawling across the Myzeqe Plain in the direct proximity to the Adriatic Sea. The park spans a territory of 222.3 square kilometres (22,230 ha) containing remarkable features such as wetlands, salt marshes, coastal meadows, floodplains, woodlands, reed beds, forests and estuaries. Because of the park's important and great availability of bird and plant species, it has been identified as an important Bird and Plant Area of international importance.

Among the largest in the Mediterranean Sea, the lagoon of Karavasta has been recognised as a wetland of international importance by designation under the Ramsar Convention. It is separated from the Adriatic Sea by a large strip of sand and was formed by the sediments of which has been discharged by the rivers Shkumbin and Seman. Located near the sea, the park experiences mediterranean climate, with temperatures that ranges between 12 °C (54 °F) in February and 24 °C (75 °F) in August.

The particular climate has favored the development of a vast array of floral and faunal species with an immense quality. In terms of biogeography, it falls entirely within the Illyrian deciduous forests terrestrial ecoregion of the Palearctic Mediterranean forests, woodlands, and scrub biome. The wealth of fauna is reflected in the list of many species and subspecies recorded to date, with 228 species of birds, 25 species of mammals, 29 species of reptiles and 29 species of amphibia.

The wetlands and swamps are abundant in algaes and dense phanerogam grasses. The forests and woodlands are ascertained by a mixture of varied species of deciduous, coniferous and mixed trees, due to the lower river valleys and sea coast. The forests are important because they provide shelter for a large number of animals, including the red fox, golden jackal and roe deer.

The park provides important spawning and nursery habitat for economically valuable fish species that are exploited by a local fisheries cooperative. It is also known for the beauty of its natural landscape, its role in the local economy and its touristic appeal. This park offers a wide range of diverse wildlife to the explorers.

However, a new resort complex project inside the park has been proposed by the construction giant Mabetex owned by Kosovo-Albanian businessman Behgjet Pacolli, fiercely opposed by environmentalists and local authorities.

== Geography ==
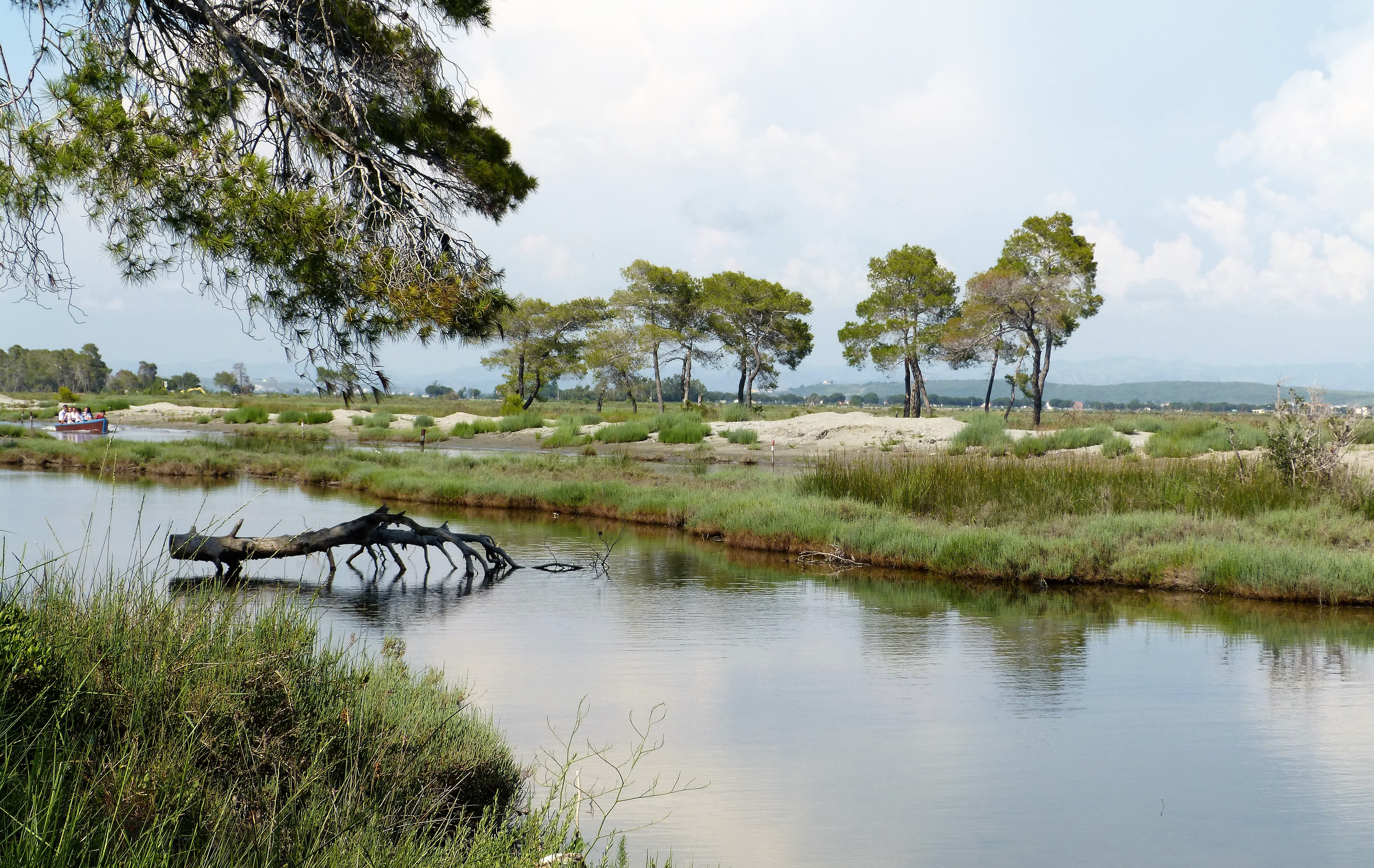
A typical habitat located within the park.

The Divjakë-Karavasta National Park is strategically located in the southeastern shore of the Adriatic Sea. The park lies mostly between latitudes 40° and 55° N and longitudes 19° and 29° E. It occupies 222.30 km^{2} (85.83 sq mi) in Fier County in southwestern Albania comprising a substantial section of the Albanian Adriatic Sea Coast. The most adjacent town to the park is Divjakë located in the east from the park entrance. The approximately 35 kilometres long coastline is relatively flat, running from the mouth of Shkumbin to the mouth of Seman.

The park's mandate includes the protection of the lagoon of Godulla and Karavasta and the estuaries of Shkumbin in the north and Seman in the south. The bodies of water of the park are chiefly affected by the inflow of those rivers, which bring sand, silt and shells, which in turn form numerous small islands and narrow spits. Due to these deposits, the lagoon bottom is relatively smooth and flat with a low salinity and a high amount of biomass that considerably affects the colour of the lagoons.

The river of Shkumbin begins at the eastern part of the mountains of Valamara in Korçë County. At Gryka e Shkumbinit, the river, which until then was trapped in a narrow valley, breaks through the Skanderbeg Mountains and enters the coastal region until it reaches the northern part of the park, where it flows into the Adriatic Sea. The river of Seman begins at the confluence of the Osum River and Devoll River as well in Korçë County. Its estuary, located in the southern part of the park, is considerably swampy and characterized by the presence of water basins and ponds.

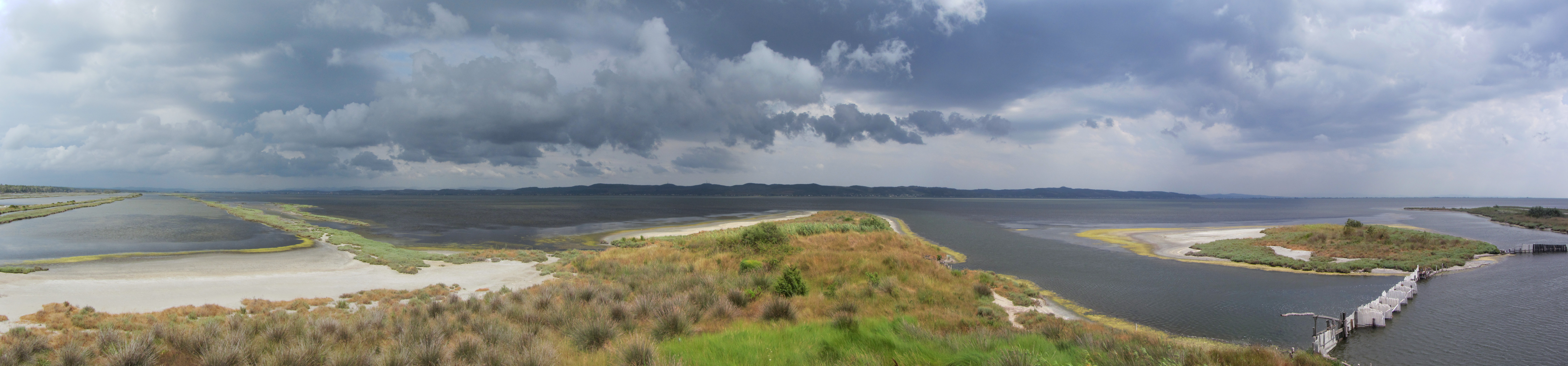
A panoramic view above the Lagoon of Karavasta.

== Biodiversity ==
=== Flora ===
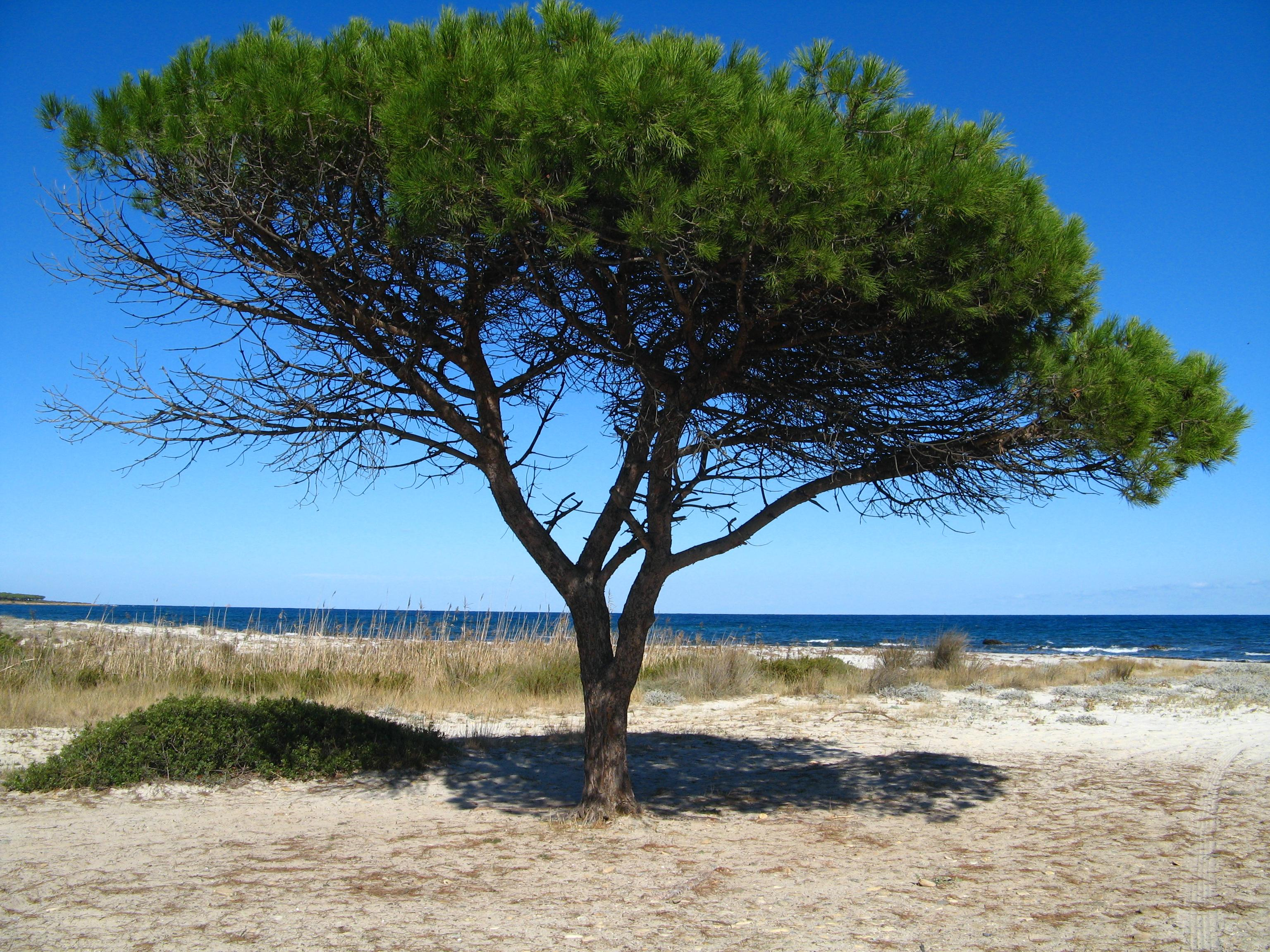
The forests of the park are abundant with stone pine.

In terms of phytogeography, the Divjakë-Karavasta National Park belongs to the Illyrian province of the Circumboreal Region within the Boreal Kingdom. It falls completely inside the Illyrian deciduous forests terrestrial ecoregion of the Palearctic Mediterranean forests, woodlands, and scrub biome. The combination of diverse geology, hydrology and specific climatic conditions on the territory of the park, has determined the considerable diversity of species and habitats, many of which are with national conservation significance.

Coastal and sand dunes are predominantly found along the shoreline of the sea as well as estuaries and lagoons. They provide a unique plant life and a healthy population of small animals and insects. This ecosystem represents a sparse cover with a little salt tolerant grass species to stabilize the dunes. The density of grass increases as the dunes become more stable.

The forests of the park are diverse, ranging from conifer to deciduous trees and woodlands. A large part of the forest resource is primarily located in the northern corner of Karavasta between the sandy beaches and the estuary of Shkumbin. Pine trees remain an increasingly dominant feature of the park represented by species such as aleppo and stone pine. There are also different species of trees found in the park amongst them junipers, willows, oak, alder, elm and ash.

=== Fauna ===
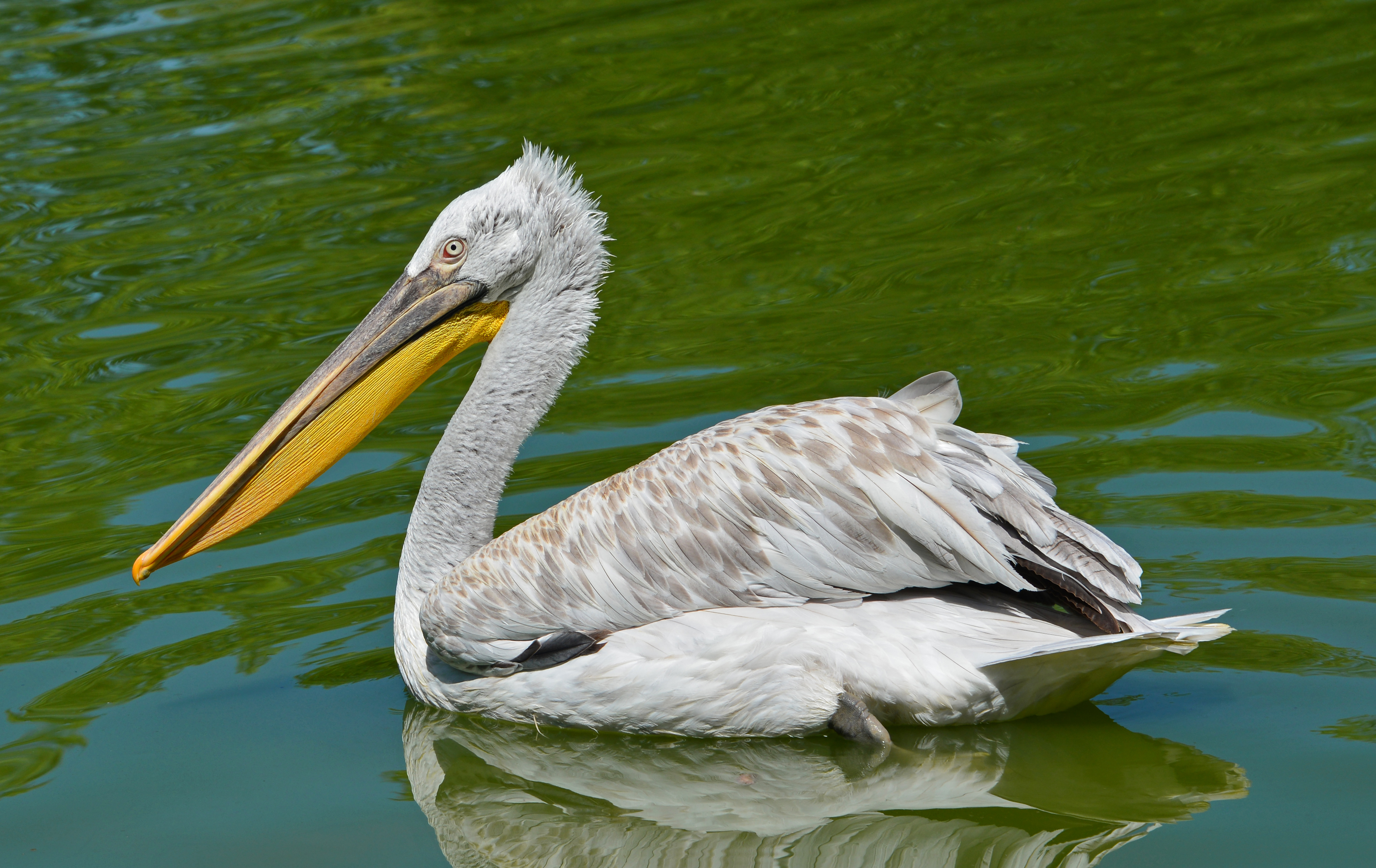
The endangered dalmatian pelican is one of many species of bird found at the park.

Based on its particular location and the mosaic distribution of various types of habitats, the great availability of water, influenced by the configuration of the terrain, has resulted an admirable fauna. The wealth of fauna is represented by 228 species of birds, 25 species of mammals, 29 species of reptiles and 29 species of amphibia.

The park is one of the country's foremost birding destinations featuring an astounding mix of more than 228 species of resident and migratory birds, of which almost 15 species are globally endangered. It possibly represents the most significant and important ecological value of the park. The sheltered open waters of the wetlands and the outlying coasts provide resting areas for migrating birds on their way between Europe and Africa through the Adriatic flyway.

The park is home to 5% of the world population of the globally endangered and extremely rare dalmatian pelican. It is endemic in the lagoon of Karavasta, which is the only coastal breeding site of this species along the Adriatic and Ionian Sea.

Given the great diversity of ecosystems, there are 25 species of mammals to be found in the dense forests and scrubs. They are not as easy to observe because they are always hiding or running away mostly due to the presence of human. The interface between meadow and forest is also favoured by many animal species because of the proximity of open areas for foraging and cover for protection. The forests provide refuge to the rare golden jackal and the globally endangered red fox, which is the most common and widespread fox species in the world. The swamps and woodlands also contain a number of endangered species such as the nearly extinct roe deer and otter.

== Gallery ==
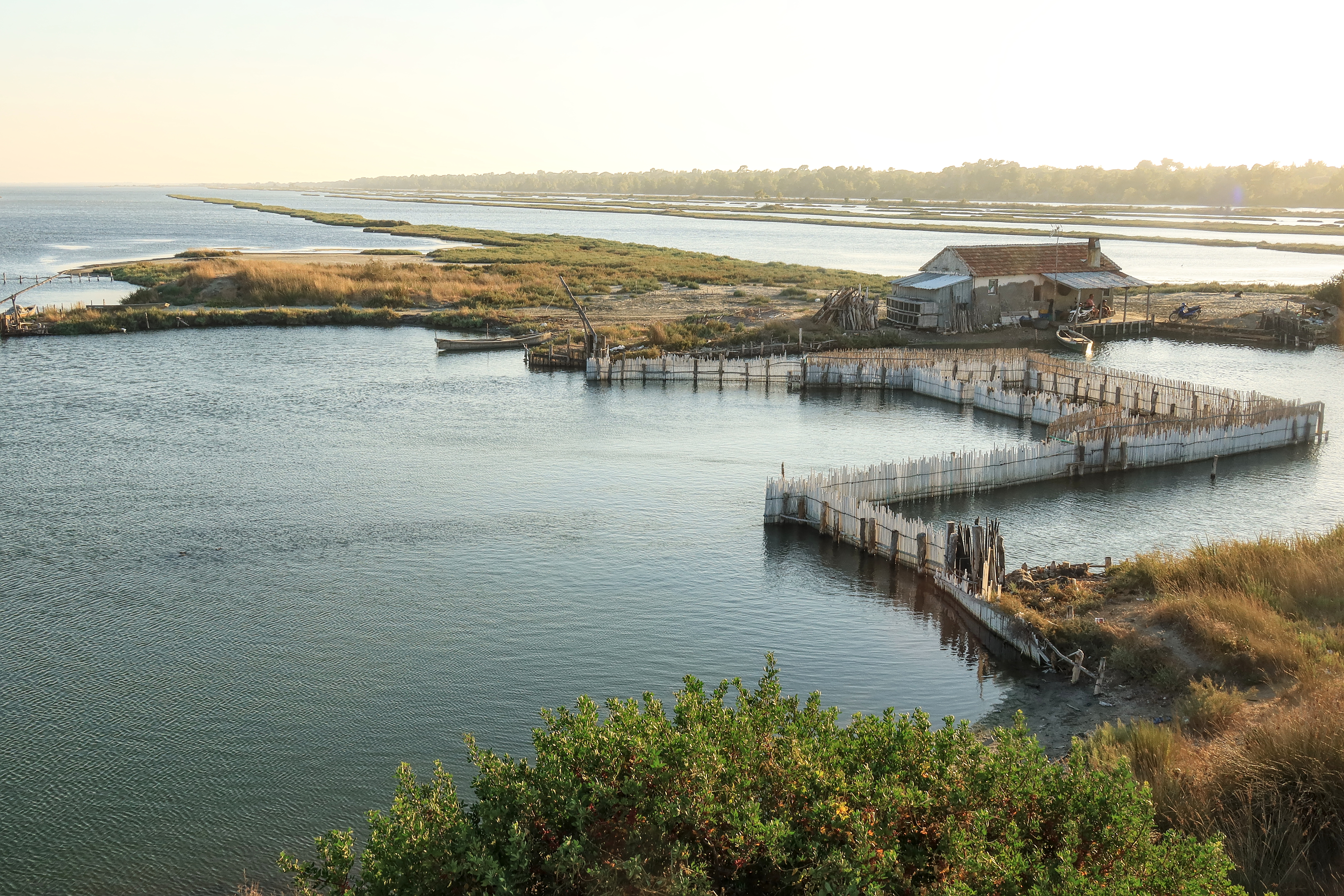
Fisherman house

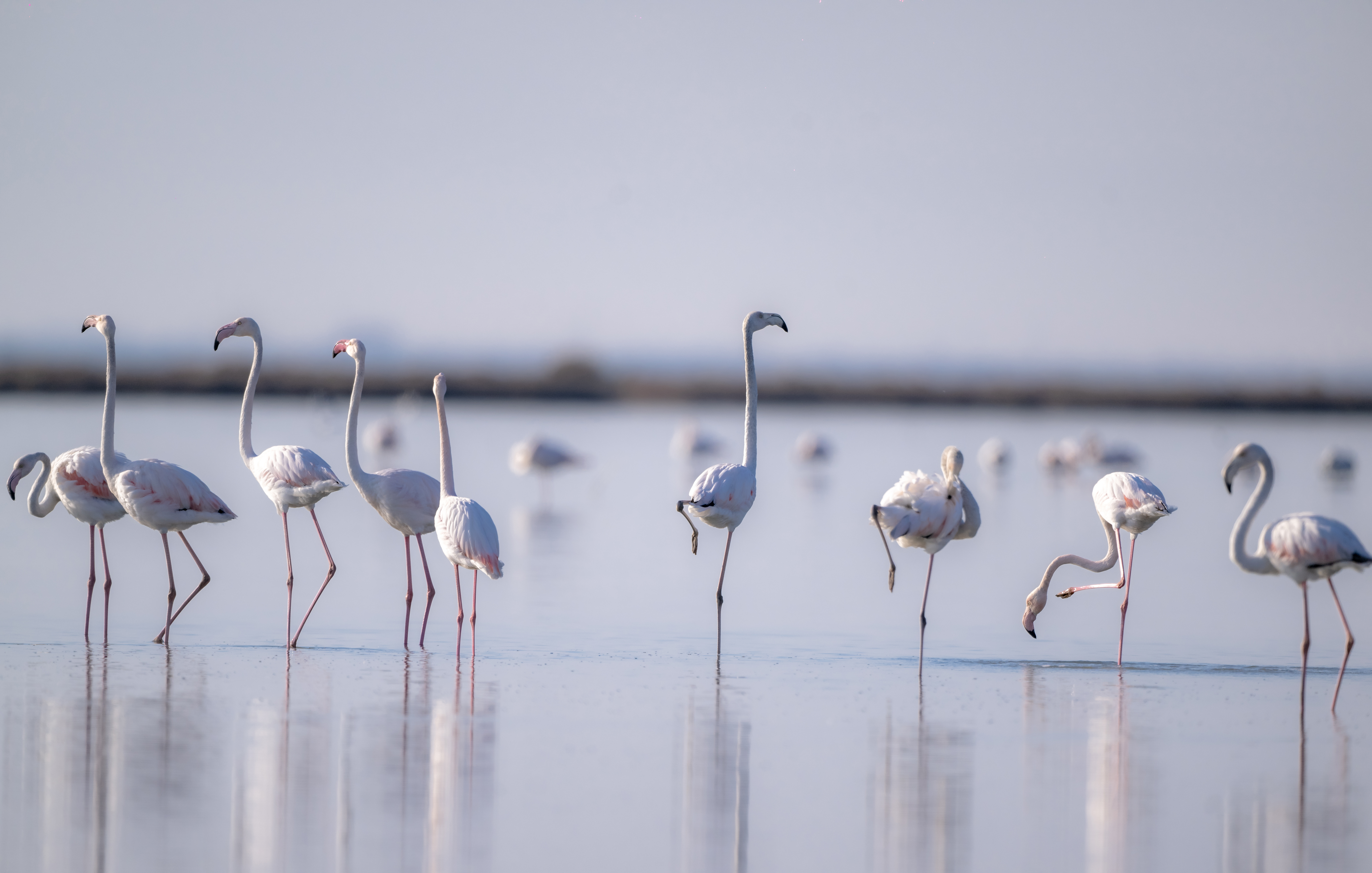
Flamingos in Divjakë

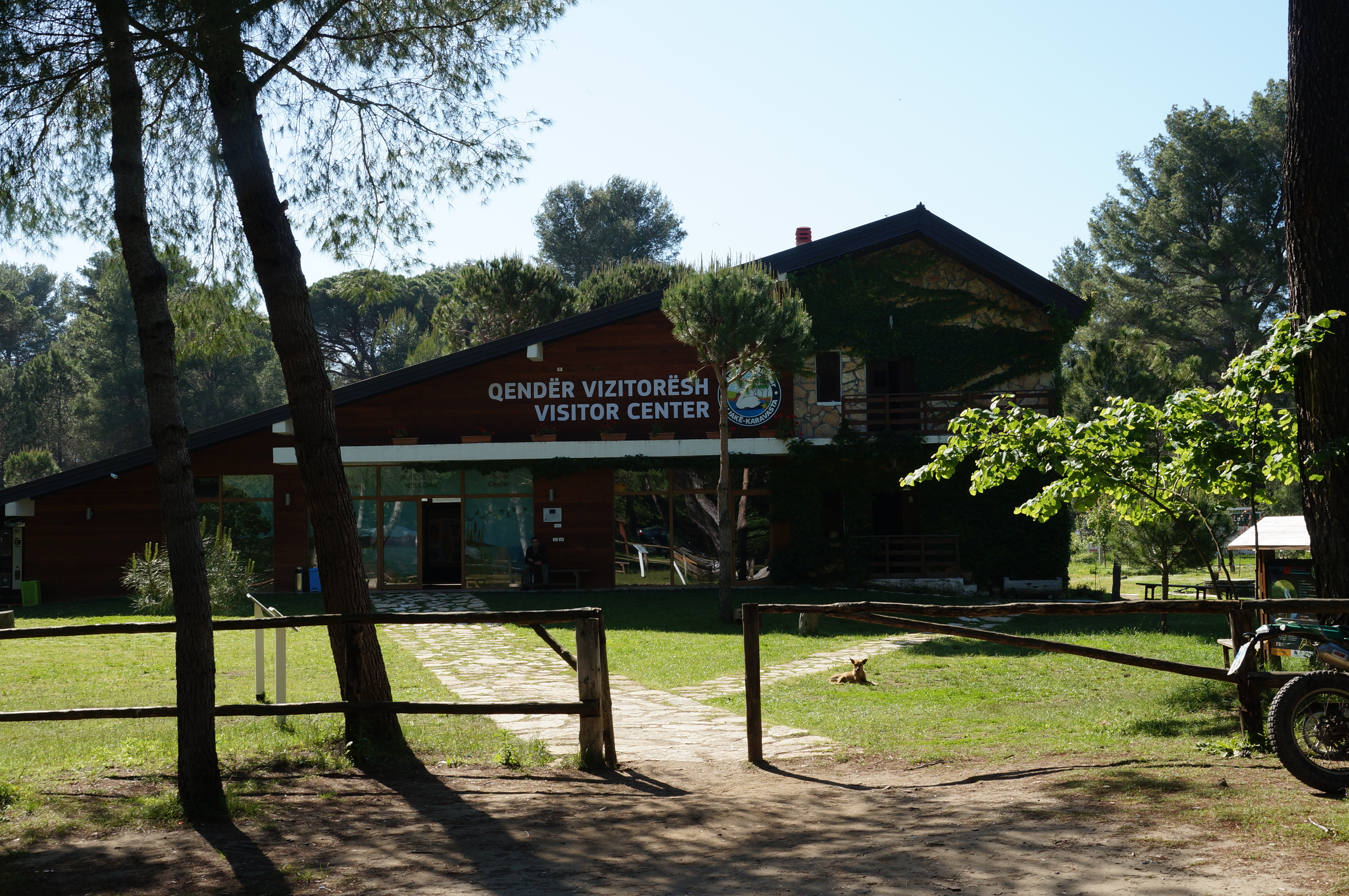
Tourist and information center

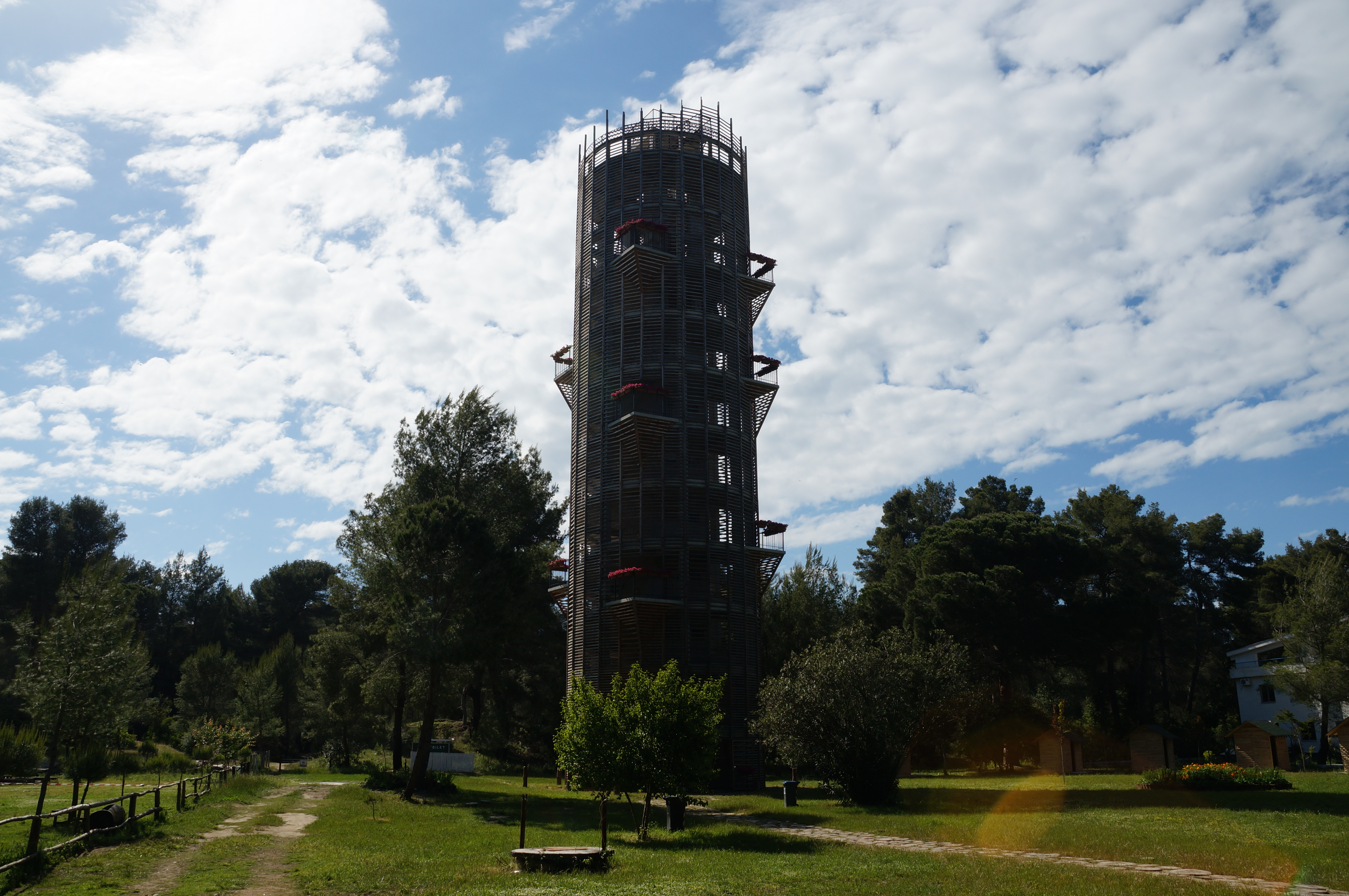
Watchtower

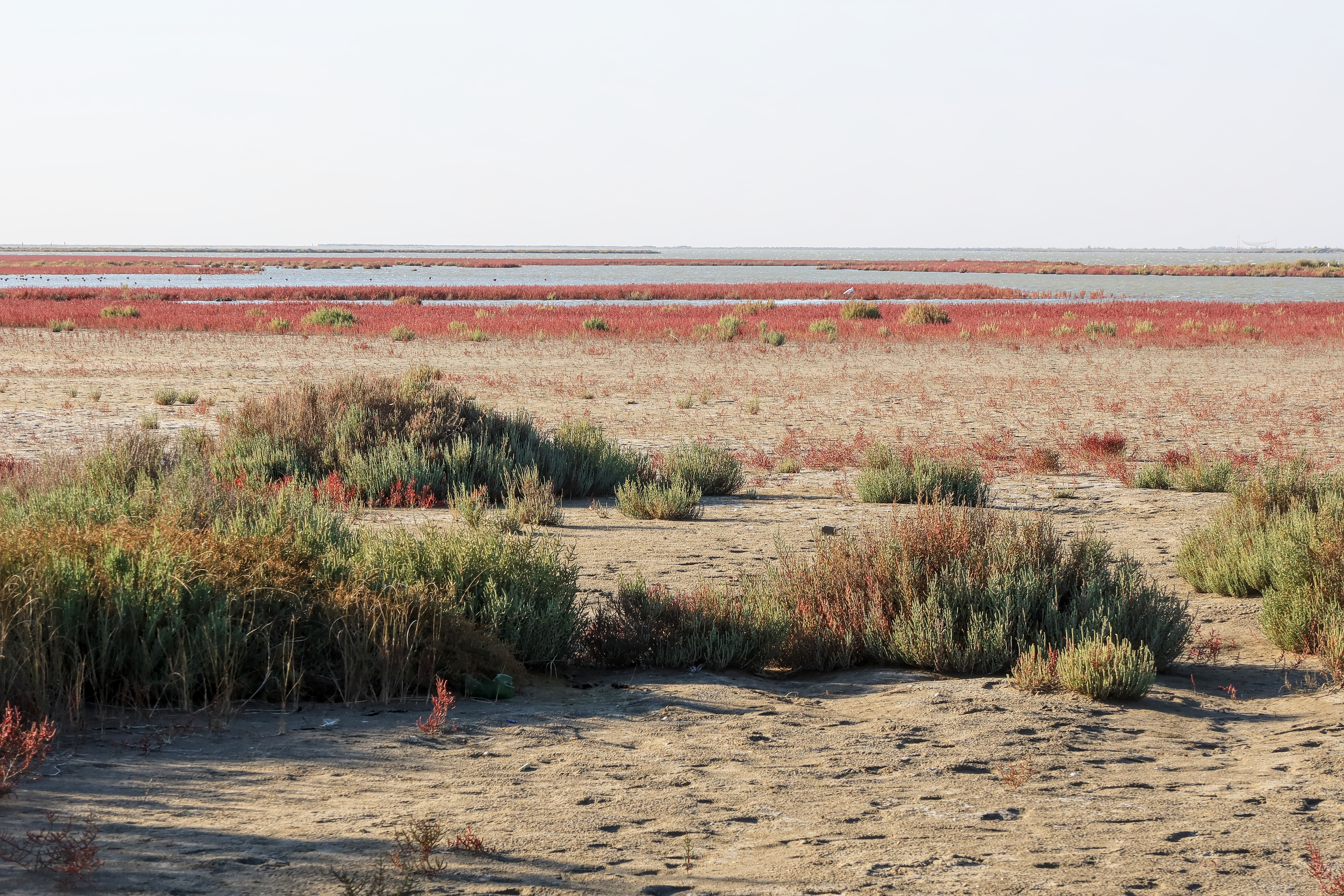
Sand dunes

== See also ==
- Geography of Albania
- Protected areas of Albania
- Albanian Adriatic Sea Coast
