= Milena Mileva Blažić =

Slovenian literary historian, professor

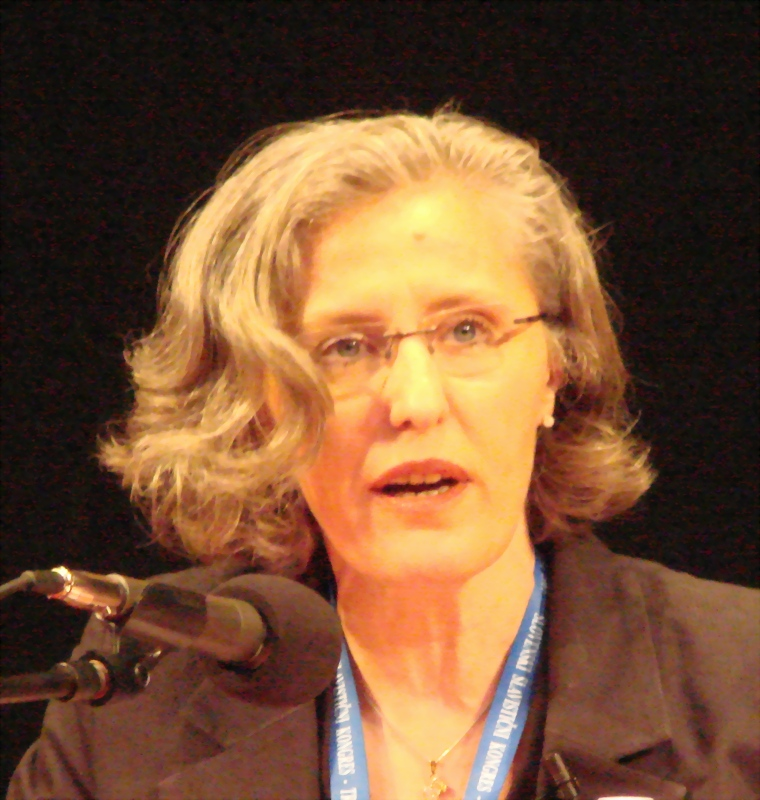
- Born: 12 September 1956 (age 69); Popuže near Šipovo, PR Bosnia and Herzegovina, FPR Yugoslavia
- Occupations: Literary historian; Professor of Children's Literature

Milena Mileva Blažić (born 12 September 1956) is a Slovenian literary historian and university professor.

== Life and work ==
Blažić attended elementary and secondary school in Novi Travnik (BiH). She has lived and worked in Ljubljana, Slovenia since 1975. In 1985 she graduated from the Department of Comparative Literature and Literary Theory at the Faculty of Arts and Science. In 1997, she gained a master's degree in Slovenian literature at the University of Ljubljana (Slovenia) and in 2001 successfully defended her doctoral thesis entitled Role and importance of teaching creative writing in Literature elementary school.

In 1991 she started working at the Pedagogical Faculty at University of Ljubljana (Slovenia) as an assistant. In 2002 she became associate professor. She has been associate professor of literature since 2008 and currently teaches didactics of Slovenian literature at the Department of Primary Education (Chair Slovene), as well as lecturing at the department for pre-school education. Since 2007, she has been assistant professor of Slovenian literature.

In 1992 she published the book Creative writing: Merry recommended science of words to text. Three workbooks of the same title were published in 1995, 1996 and 1997. She has led a number of educational seminars for teachers of Slovene literary clubs, trainers and librarians in Slovenia, Italy and Austria.

Blažić has co-edited an anthology of poetry fifth annual Time: 100 to songs for the young (2001) and is co-author of two award-winning elementary schools Beryl Council for words, 7 (Bologna Book Fair 2003: 2nd prize and the Frankfurt Book Fair, 2003: 1st prize). She has participated in two EU projects in the field of youth literature and ICT and is a member of two scientific associations: Nordic Network for Children's Literature and International Research Society for Children's Literature (IRSCL).

Between 2006 and 2008 she was secretary of Slavic Association of Slovenia. Since 2006, she has also worked as a Councillor in the City Council at the Ljubljana Municipality. Her husband, Jani Kovačič is a singer songwriter.

== Selected bibliography ==
- Models for the creative teaching of literature in primary school. Ljubljana: Institute of Education of the Republic of Slovenia, 2000. (COBISS)
- Secret Treasures Reading: reading and literary journals in the primary school education: teaching manual for teachers to (secret) creative reading log from 2 to 9 (from 1 to 8). Ljubljana: Rokus, 20001; 20012th(COBISS)
- Historical overview of Slovenian children's writing (1850-2000), Ljubljana: Faculty of Education, 2002. (COBISS)
- Creative writing. Exercises to develop creative writing skills, Ljubljana: GV Education, 2003 (COBISS)
- School, in theory - theory in school, Journal of Science XXI/160/161 criticism. Ljubljana: Journal for the Criticism of Science, 1993. (Co-authorship with others) (COBISS)
- Dane Zajc Ljubljana: Nova magazine, 1995. (A collection of interpretations, 4). (Co-authorship with others) (COBISS)
- The Understanding of Metaphor by Elementary School Students. Q: The empirical and Systemic Approach to Literature and Culture as Theory and application, Ed. Tötösy de Zepetnek, Steven Sywenky, Irene. 1997th 385-39 1. (COBISS)
- Reading And Writing Appreciation and University Elementary schools: results of a survey, Reader 35/36. Houghton, Michi, 1996. 55–66. (COBISS) [8].
- Place and Function of Children's Literature and the Next Millennium 1997th (COBISS)
- Feature sites in the Slovenian Youth Literature = The city as a youth, medical and Motif literature, Urban Challenge XIV / 2 2003rd 29–34, 97-100. (COBISS)
- Art and pedagogy: From Reader Response to writer-response theory. They are based on II / 2, 2004th 153–162. (COBISS)
- Literaray history of children's literature in Slovenia. A child and a book XXXI/61. 2004th 67–77. (COBISS)

== See also ==
- List of Slovenian literary historians and critics
