= Blaž Zbičajnik =

Slovenian footballer

Personal information
- Full name: Blaž Zbičajnik
- Date of birth: 24 July 1995 (age 31)
- Place of birth: Celje, Slovenia
- Height: 1.79 m (5 ft 10 in)
- Position: Midfielder

Youth career
- –2014: Celje

Senior career*
Years	Team	Apps	(Gls)
2014–2017	Celje	2	(0)
2014	→ Šmartno 1928 (loan)	11	(0)
2015	→ unknown (loan)	11	(1)
2016	→ Drava Ptuj (loan)	1	(0)
2016–2017	→ Dravinja (loan)	20	(3)
2017–2019	Zreče	33	(8)

International career
2013	Slovenia U18	1	(0)
- * Club domestic league appearances and goals as of 1 March 2017

Blaž Zbičajnik (born 24 July 1995) is a Slovenian football midfielder.
