= Vlaho =

Vlaho is a Croatian masculine given name, cognate to Blaise. It is common in the Dubrovnik area because of the patron saint of the city is Sveti Vlaho (St. Blaise).

Notable people with the name include:

- Vlaho Bukovac (1855–1922), Croatian painter and academic
- Vlaho Getaldić (1788–1872), Ragusan writer, translator and politician
- Vlaho Kabužić (1698–1750), Ragusan nobleman and diplomat
- Vlaho Paljetak (1893–1944), Croatian composer

== See also ==
- Blaž (given name)
