= Blaženko =

Blaženko is a given name. People with the given name include:

- Blaženko Lacković, (born 1980), Croatian handball player
- Blaženko Bekavac, (born 1975), Croatian footballer
- Blaženko Boban, (born 1960), Croatian politician
