= Fortress of Bashtovë =

Medieval quadrangular fortress in central Albania

- Kalaja e Bashtovës
- Vilë-Ballaj, Tirana County in Albania
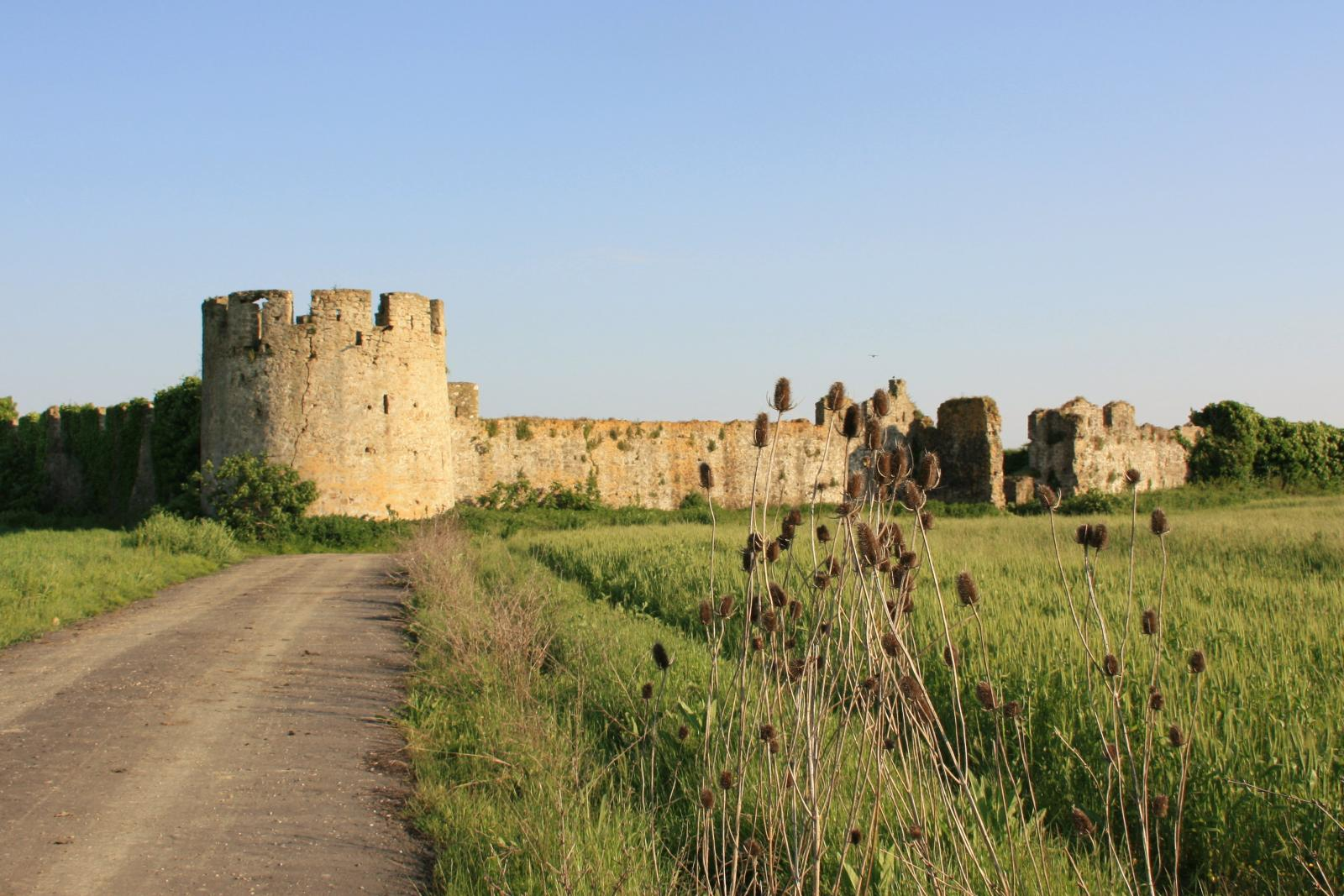

Site information
- Type: Fortress
- Owner: Albania
- Controlled by: Byzantine Empire; Principality of Mataranga; Principality of Albania; Republic of Venice; Ottoman Empire; Albania
- Open to the public: Yes

Location
- Location in Albania
- Coordinates: 41.0469°N 19.4965°E

Site history
- Built: 6th or 15th Century

The Fortress of Bashtovë (Albanian: Kalaja e Bashtovës), also known in medieval times as Breg, Briego or Vrego is a medieval quadrangular fortress located close to the outflow of the Shkumbin River into the Adriatic Sea in central Albania. It is part of the tentative list of Albania in order to qualify for inclusion in the UNESCO World Heritage Site list.

The fortress is built on a fertile flat ground east of the mouth of the Shkumbin River. The ruins are located some 2 kilometres (1.2 mi) from the village of Vilë-Ballaj in Tirana County. By air, it is 36 kilometres (22 miles) north of Fier, 20 kilometres (12 miles) northwest of Lushnjë, 15 kilometres (9.3 miles) south of Kavajë and 40 kilometres (25 miles) southwest of Tirana.

== History ==
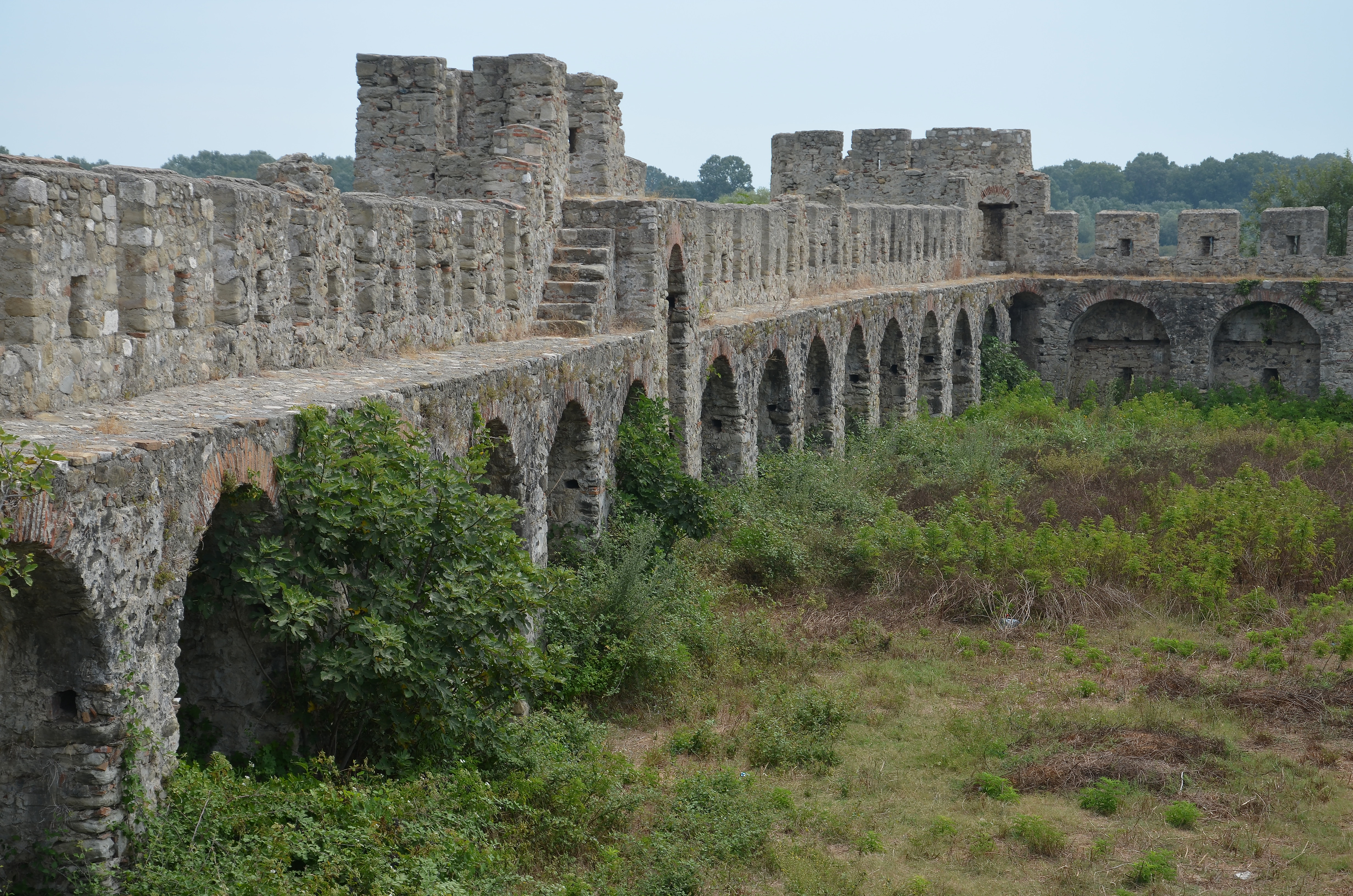
View from inside of the castle

Previously in the Middle Ages, the region of Bashtovë was known as a trade harbor and otherwise centre for the export of grains. The origin of the fortress has been for some time a matter of dispute among historians. The initial fortress was constructed during the time when the region was part of the Venetian Empire as according to Gjerak Karaiskaj. However, Alain Ducellier has asserted that the Venetians have built over an existing former structure, which dates back to the 6th century, when the area was under the Byzantine Empire during the Justinian dynasty.

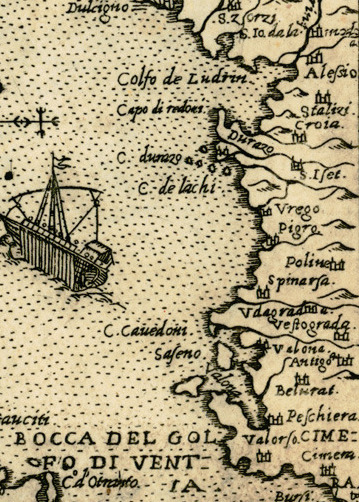
Bashtovë castle on a 1574 map referred to as Vrego.

The fortress is a rectangular structure oriented to the north-south direction. There are three entrances, from which there still are well-preserved archaeological traces they were placed at the northern, western and eastern walls. The walls are 9 metres (30 ft) high and comprise a roughly 60 by 90 metres (200 by 300 ft) interior. In the north and east, there stands round towers each of them 12 metres (39 ft) high.

In recent years, interventions have been proposed for the fortress's rehabilitation.

== See also ==
- Castles in Albania
- World Heritage Sites in Albania
- Architecture of Albania
- Venetian Albania
