= Karavasta Lagoon =

Lagoon in Albania

- IUCN category II (national park)
- The lagoon seen from space
- Interactive map of Karavasta Lagoon
- Location: 20 km (12 mi) from Lushnjë, Albania
- Coordinates: 40°55′39″N 19°29′55″E
- Length: 15.4 km (9.6 mi)
- Width: 4.1 km (2.5 mi)
- Area: 42 km^{2} (16 sq mi)
- Elevation: 0 m (0 ft)
- Established: 1966

Karavasta Lagoon (Albanian: Laguna e Karavastasë) is the largest lagoon in Albania and one of the largest adjoining the Mediterranean Sea, spanning an area of 42 km^{2} (16 sq mi). Karavasta is part of the Divjakë Karavasta National Park and is separated from the Adriatic Sea by a large strip of sand. It sprawls across the Myzeqe coastal plain near Divjakë and some 20 km (12 mi) near Lushnjë.

== Name ==
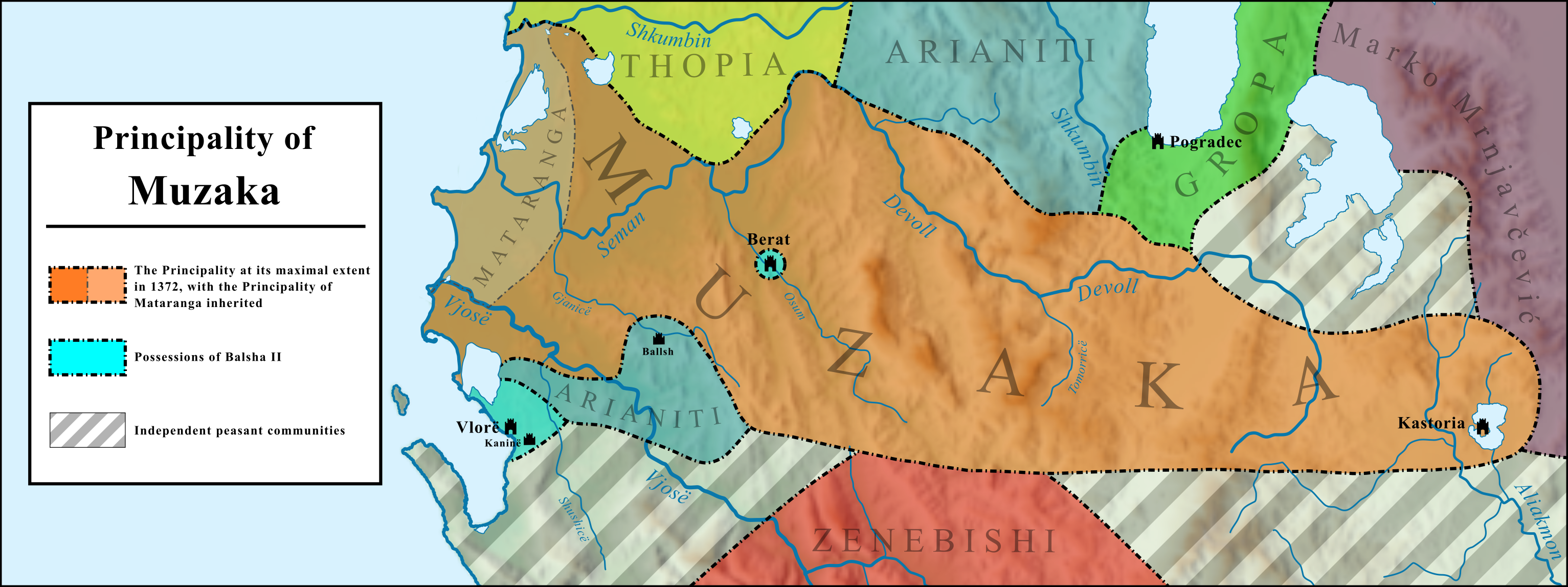
Karavasta Lagoon within the Albanian Principality of Mataranga.

The name is mentioned for the first time in 1297, when the people of the Albanian Principality of Mataranga of Caravastasi (Latin: homines Matarangi de Caravastasi) attacked and robbed a ship that had stopped in the lagoon.

The Albanian name Karavasta is a loan from Greek: καραβοστάση karavostasi "place of anchorage". Evidently Karavasta in medieval times was navigable and served as a natural harbor for ships, and perhaps as a place for building ships.

== Flora and fauna ==
Karavasta hosts many pine trees and small sandy islands. It is renowned for hosting the Dalmatian pelican; 6.4% of the Europe's population of the Dalmatian pelican is found in Karavasta. The lagoon falls within the Illyrian deciduous forests terrestrial ecoregion of the Palearctic Mediterranean forests, woodlands, and scrub biome. The climate is typically mediterranean.

== Geomorphology ==
The lagoon is located inside the boundaries of Divjaka-Karavasta National Park and has been recognised as a wetland of international importance by designation under the Ramsar Convention. The lagoon has been identified as an Important Bird Area by BirdLife International, because it supports significant numbers of the populations of various bird species.

The Karavasta Lagoon is within the List of Ramsar wetlands of international importance and is part of the Divjake-Karavasta National Park.

== Preservation ==
Since disinfection campaigns have long been halted, the area is known to have a very active mosquito season. However, in 2014, disinfection campaigns have started and a park rehabilitation project has been initiated by the national authorities. It included a hunting moratorium which revived bird-watching activities.

== See also ==
- Divjaka-Karavasta National Park
- Geography of Albania
- Lagoons of Albania
