= Balšić family tree =

Family tree of the Balša family

Family tree of the Balšić noble family

Paternal Balšić family members in bold.

- **Balša** I (fl. 1356–1362)
  - **Stracimir**
    - **Đurađ II Balšić**
      - **Balša III**
        - **Jelena** (married herzog Stjepan Vukčić Kosača)
          - Vladislav Hercegović
            - Petar
              - Matija
                - Miklos
                  - Ivan
                  - Andrija
                  - Tomaš
                  - Unknown Daughter
                - Unknown Daughter
              - Vladislav Hercegović
          - Katarina, married King of Bosnia Stephen Thomas
            - Sigismund (Šimun) Kotromanić (converted to Islam and changed his name to Ishak-beg Kraljević (Ishak-bey Kraloglu))
            - Katarina Kotromanić
          - Vlatko Hercegović
            - Marija
            - Jovan Hercegović
              - Isabella
              - Sava
              - Vlatko
                - Giovanni
                  - Vlatko
                    - Elisabeta
              - Ferante
        - Unknown Son
        - Teodora (Dorotea)
  - **Đurađ I** with Olivera Mrnjavčević (first wife) and Teodora Dejanović Dragaš (second wife)
    - **Jelisaveta** (or Jelisanta)
      - Unknown Child
        - Jelena
          - Nikola
          - Jakov
          - Monćino
          - Dabiživ Monetić
    - **Goisava**
    - **Jevdokija** (Eudokia), married Esau de' Buondelmonti, ruler of Epirus 1385–1411)
      - Giorgio de' Buondelmonti, ruler of Epirus 1411
    - **Konstantin (Košta)** (married Helena Thopia, a daughter of Karl Thopia)
      - **Stefan Balšić "Maramonte"** (fl. 1419–40), pretender to Zeta
    - Đorđe
      - Đorđe
      - Another son
    - Jelena
    - **Đurađ** (illegitimate), his son Stefan Strez Balšić married Vlajka Kastrioti (Skanderbeg's sister) and had two sons: Ivan and Gojko who in 1444 were among the founders of the League of Lezhë.
  - **Balša II** married Comita Muzaka († 1392), daughter of Andrea II Muzaka, Despot of Berat)
    - **Ruđina**
  - Voisava Balšić, married Karl Topia, the Prince of Albania, with whom she had one son, Gjergj Thopia, Prince of Albania, and two daughters, Helena Thopia, Lady of Krujë, married Konstantin Balšić, and Voisava Thopia, Lady of Lezhë
