= Maria Thopia =

14th-century Albanian noblewoman

Maria Thopia Maria Topia
- Baroness of Botrugno
- Predecessor: Isabella Antoglietta
- Born: Unknown; Principality of Albania
- Died: Unknown; Kingdom of Naples
- Noble family: Thopia
- Spouse: Filippo Maramonte
- Issue: 3 children
- Father: Karl Thopia
- Mother: Unknown

Maria Thopia (Albanian: Maria Topia) was a 14th-15th century Albanian noblewoman and a recognised illegitimate daughter of Karl Thopia, Prince of Albania, by an unknown mistress. She married Filippo Maramonte, 1st Baron of Botrugno, chancellor and marshal of Ladislaus of Naples.

== Early life ==
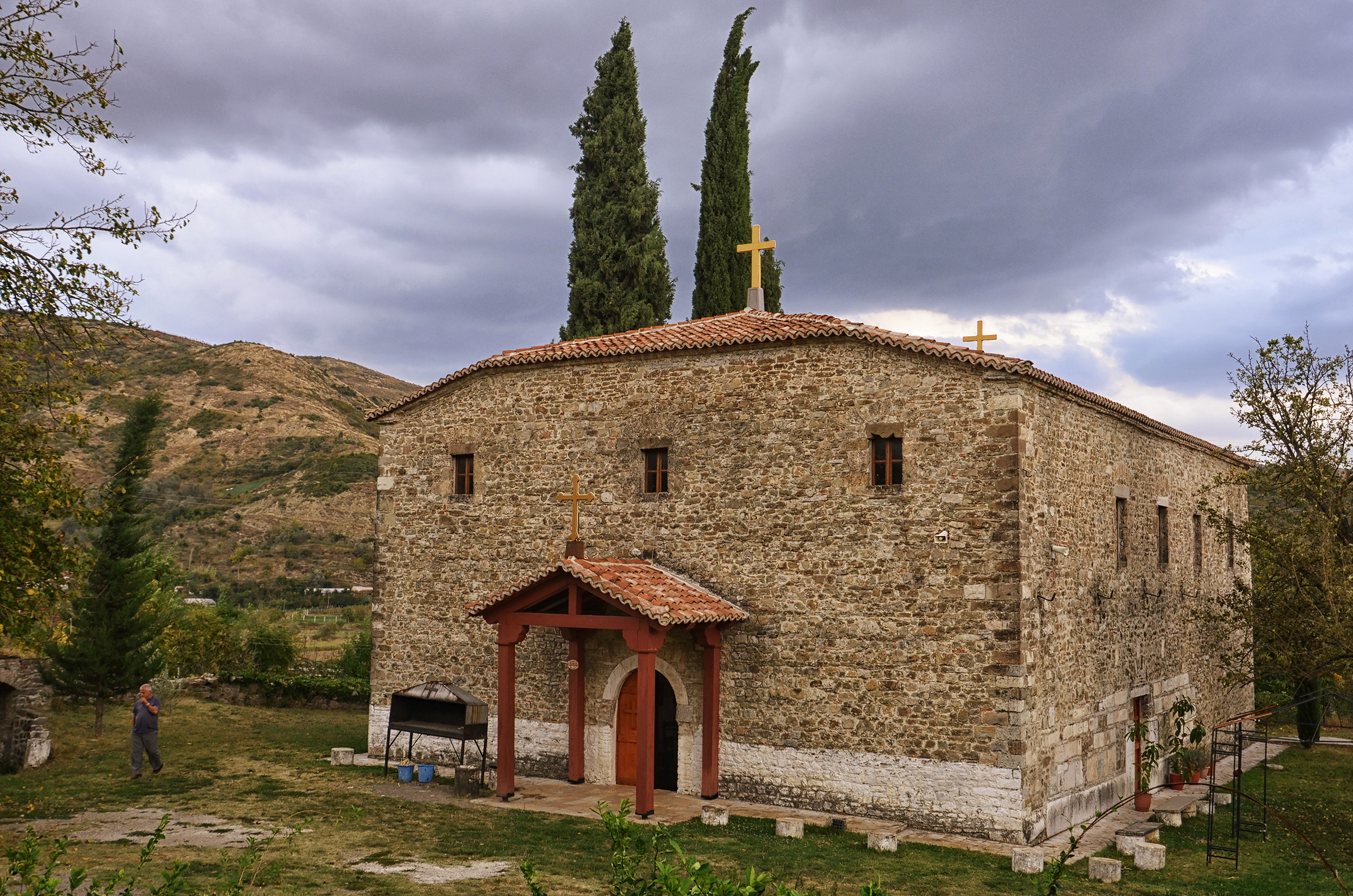
St. John Vladimir's Church founded by Maria's father

Nothing is known about Maria's early life except of her illegitimacy. Her father, Karl Thopia, was a son of Andrea I Thopia, Count of Matia and Hélène of Anjou. Her grandmother, was herself an illegitimate daughter of Robert, King of Naples, who was initially set to marry the Prince of Morea before breaking the engagement off. Maria's father had another recognised illegitimate son, Niketa Thopia, and three legitimate children, Gjergj, Helena and Voisava by his wife Voisava of Zeta. It is not known whether or not Maria's and Niketa's mother were the same mistress, or if their father's affairs took place before or during his marriage to Voisava.

== Marriage ==
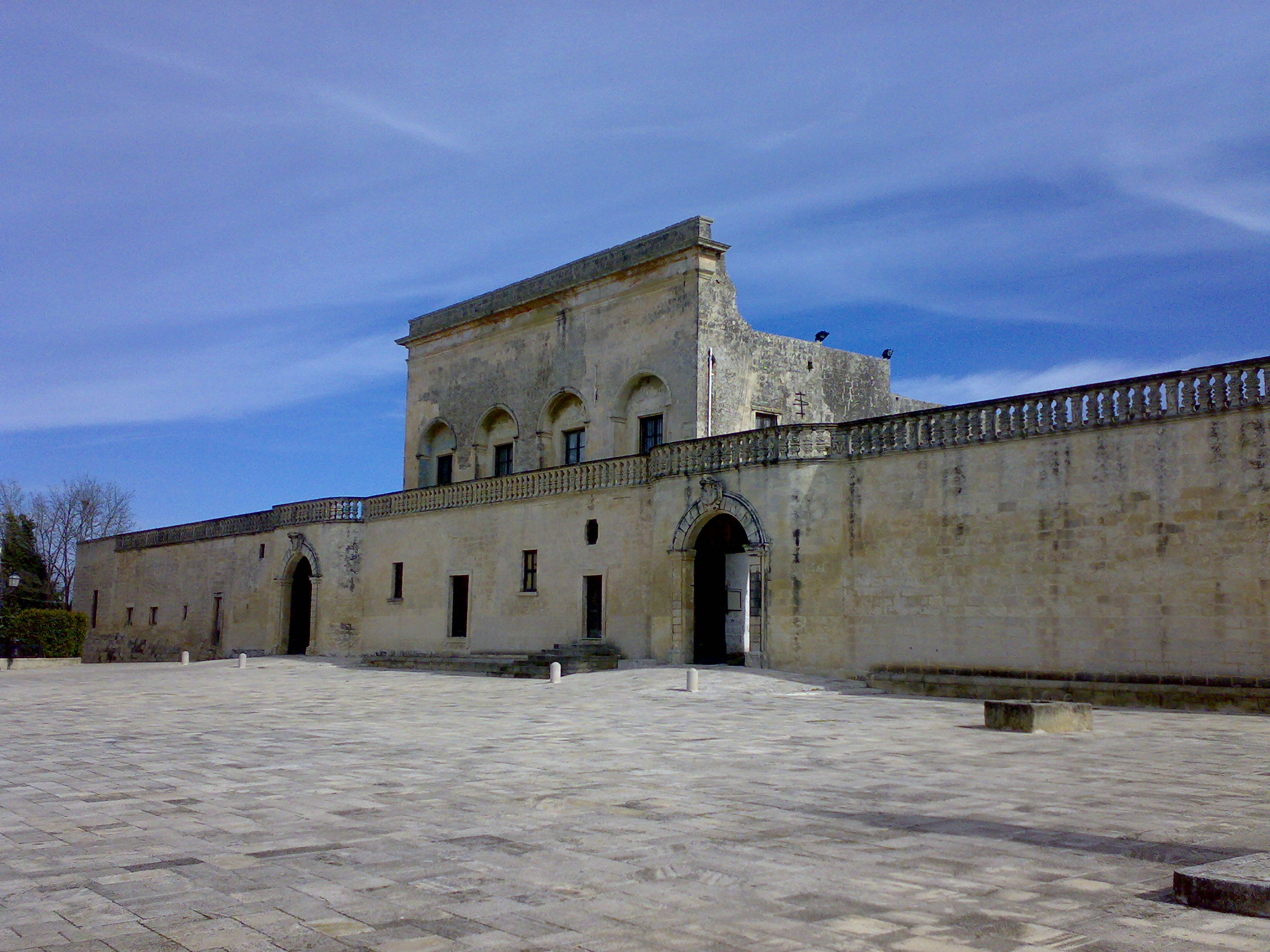
Palazzo Marchesale di Botrugno

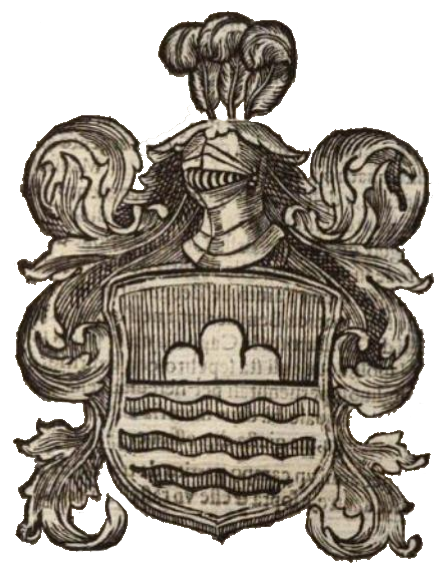
Coat of arms of the Maramonte family

Maria married Filippo Maramonte, member of the Maramonte family, who likely originated from Maramont in Artois, France and were feudal lords in Terra d'Otranto, Province of Chieti, Abruzzo Citra and County of Molise. His parents, Maramonte di Maramonti and Isabella Antoglietta were married in 1352, when his mother brought as dowry the town of Matino. By 1400, Filippo was already a chancellor and marshal of Ladislaus of Naples. Her brother-in-law, on the other hand, Carlo Maramonte, Lord of Campi was a Chamberlain of the king. The couple had three children together.

== Refuge of Helena Thopia ==
After the death of her husband, Kostandin Balsha in 1402 and the capture of the city of Krujë by Niketa in 1403, Helena Thopia and her son took refuge with Maria and her family. She had been appointed by their father as Lady of Krujë in her own right, but her reign encountered constant attacks and conflicts by their half-brother Niketa, who eventually took control of the city. Maria's nephew, Stefan was raised by the couple and as a result was referred to as Stefan Maramonte by the Venetians and Ragusans.

== Family tree ==
Ancestors of Maria Thopia

8. Tanusio Thopia
4. Andrea I Thopia
2. Karl Thopia
20. Charles II of Naples
10. Robert, King of Naples
21. Mary of Hungary
5. Hélène of Anjou
11. Unknown mistress
1. Maria
3. Unknown mistress
