= Phillip Barelli =

14th-century Venetian merchant in Albania

- Disappeared: 1401; Cape Rodon, Principality of Albania
- Years active: 1374–1401
- Title: Chamberlain of Albania; Protovestiar

Phillip Barelli (Albanian: Filip Barelli), also attested as Philipus Barelli in Ragusan documents, was a 14th-century Venetian merchant and chamberlain in Albania during the Middle Ages. Barelli worked in the courts of Albanian nobility, such as those of Gjergj Thopia, the prince of the Principality of Albania, as well as the protovestiar of Balsha II and managed the finance and trade of the Lordship of Zeta.

== Service in the Lordship of Zeta ==
=== Entry into Balsha’s court ===
Barelli was first attested in June 1374 as present within the court of Balsha II amongst witnesses as a protovestiar and was the financial minister as well as the Chamberlain of the ducal court. His role required him to collect taxes, manage treasury or funds and handled correspondence in running state finance’s. In a charter issued by Balsha II he was named as “Protovestiar Philip Barelli”. He grew wealthy through fees and land grants.

=== Looting incident ===
On 5 July 1372, a quantity of Barelli’s goods located in Kotor (which at the time was controlled by Balsha) had been looted by the city’s population. The Venetian senate was angered upon hearing the news and forced all the goods to be returned to Barelli and a full compensation for the damages done to be paid within 2 months, or else all Venetian’s in the city and their property would leave in less than 15 days and move to a safer place. On 19 October 1372, Kotor refused to return the looted goods or pay the compensation to Philip Barelli, but sent its ambassador to meet the senate in Venice to revoke the previous discussion. He pleaded to the Venetian senate not to withdraw its merchants, arguing that after the investigation, none of the city’s inhabitants were considered guilty. The senate agreed to postpone its threat and awaited for Barelli to return to the city and act on his confession. Barelli confirmed that the city’s inhabitants were guilty of the event and forced the city to repay Barelli.

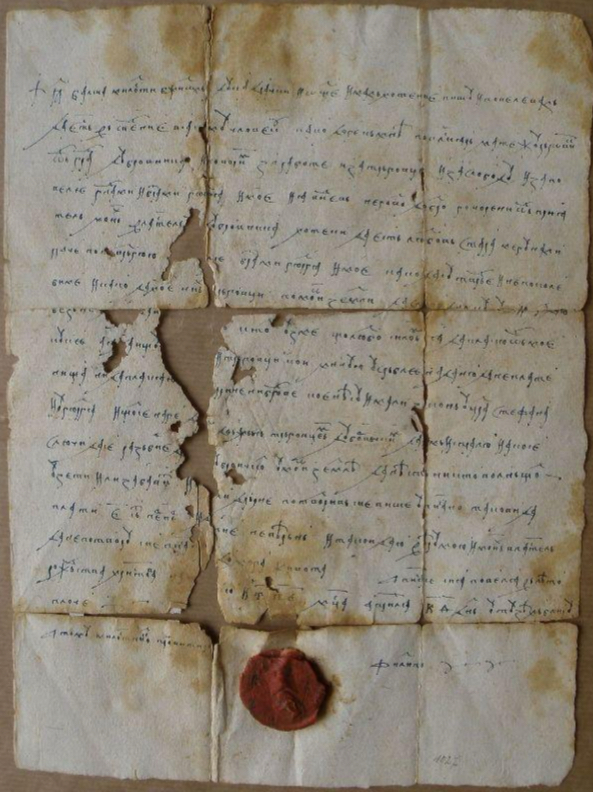
Charter issued by Balsha written by Phillip Barelli

=== Contracts and Service ===
Barelli appears as a witness for George I Balsha and Balsha II for a commercial deal located at the mouth of the Mat River on 9 June 1374. Barelli was the only Venetian witness present in the document, while all the other witnesses were local Albanians.

On 13 January 1381, Barelli was asked by his trade partner Angelo Condelmario to be able to load 400 pairs of clothes onto galleys leaving Venice and stored in Ulcinj. In this regard, the Venetian republic granted them the right of use against payment fees. If the merchants were unable to do so, Barelli ordered that could load them in Durrës, Corfu or Crete.

Barelli also seems to be present in 1386 at a residence owned by the Balsha in Ulcinj. Later on May 25, 1386, Ragusan documents mention Barelli and other Venetian merchants residing in Ulcinj to extract 50 cubes of wheat.

Under Gjergj II Balsha, Barelli continued his service in the same roles, frequently working at Ulcinj and later at Krujë. He functioned as an administrator and a Venetian agent, arranging supplies, credit and relating news to Venice. Barelli also arranged supplies and negotiated a grain export contract in Dubrovnik. Other Venetian councillors like Barelli had also become common in other northern Albanian courts, enabling local nobility to maintain and establish connection in Western Europe. He was a key link between the Balsha and the other states in the Adriatic that were active in trading, and he exercised significant influence through both his official office and his merchant networks. Citizens of Zeta were able to purchase land from Venetians through Philip Barelli.

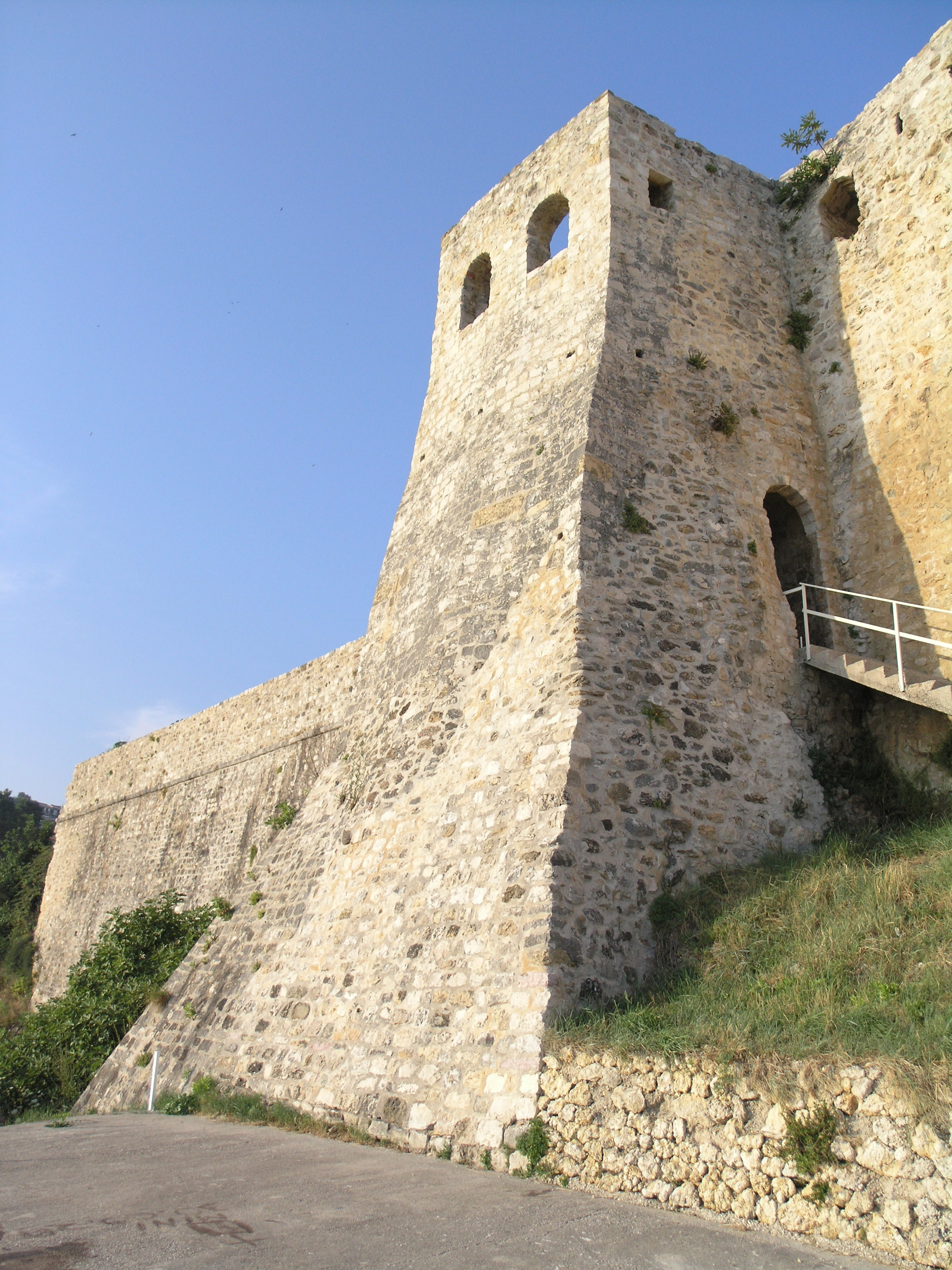
Ulcinj fortress

=== Imprisonment and later release ===
According to one account, the Serbian Lord Vuk Branković had attempted to bribe Barelli to betray George Stracimir’s fortress in Ulcinj with a payment of 500 “litres” of silver. In 1390, Balsha grew suspicious of Barelli and had him immediately imprisoned. Barelli insisted on his loyalty and claimed that he had expelled Vuk’s envoy with “insulting words”. Venice consistently pleaded to the Balsha for the release of Barelli, and confirmed his innocence. Balsha continued to declare Barelli as guilty, and the envoys continued to attempt to intervene for the release of his innocent sons.

On 29 July 1390, Venice sent another ambassador for the release of Barelli and his sons, which was also unsuccessful. Two months later, after many letters from Venice, Balsha responded to Antonio Zuchato who informed him that the senate asked Balsha to order an independent investigation, which according to Venice could prove Barelli’s innocence. According to Venice, this also affected other Venetian citizens as Barelli was in debt of 3,800 ducats to other citizens and many of his property had been purchased with the money of his creditors.

In 1391 Barelli was also suspected of conspiring with Balsha’s cousin, Konstantin Balsha, leading Balsha to charge him with a “felony against the prince” and confiscated his property, while the crime he was accused of had still remained unresolved. Philip Barelli’s creditors sent an agent at their own expense to recover the debts he owed them. On 15 September 1391, Venice demanded that Balsha returned the money to the creditors and all the property held by Barelli before his imprisonment. Ten days later Venetian envoys met Balsha, who claimed that Barelli had been acting against the state. The Venetians reassured Balsha that Barelli had always wanted him to expand his dominions. By Venice’s request, on 26 September 1391, Balsha agreed to release Barelli from imprisonment.

== Service in the Principality of Albania ==
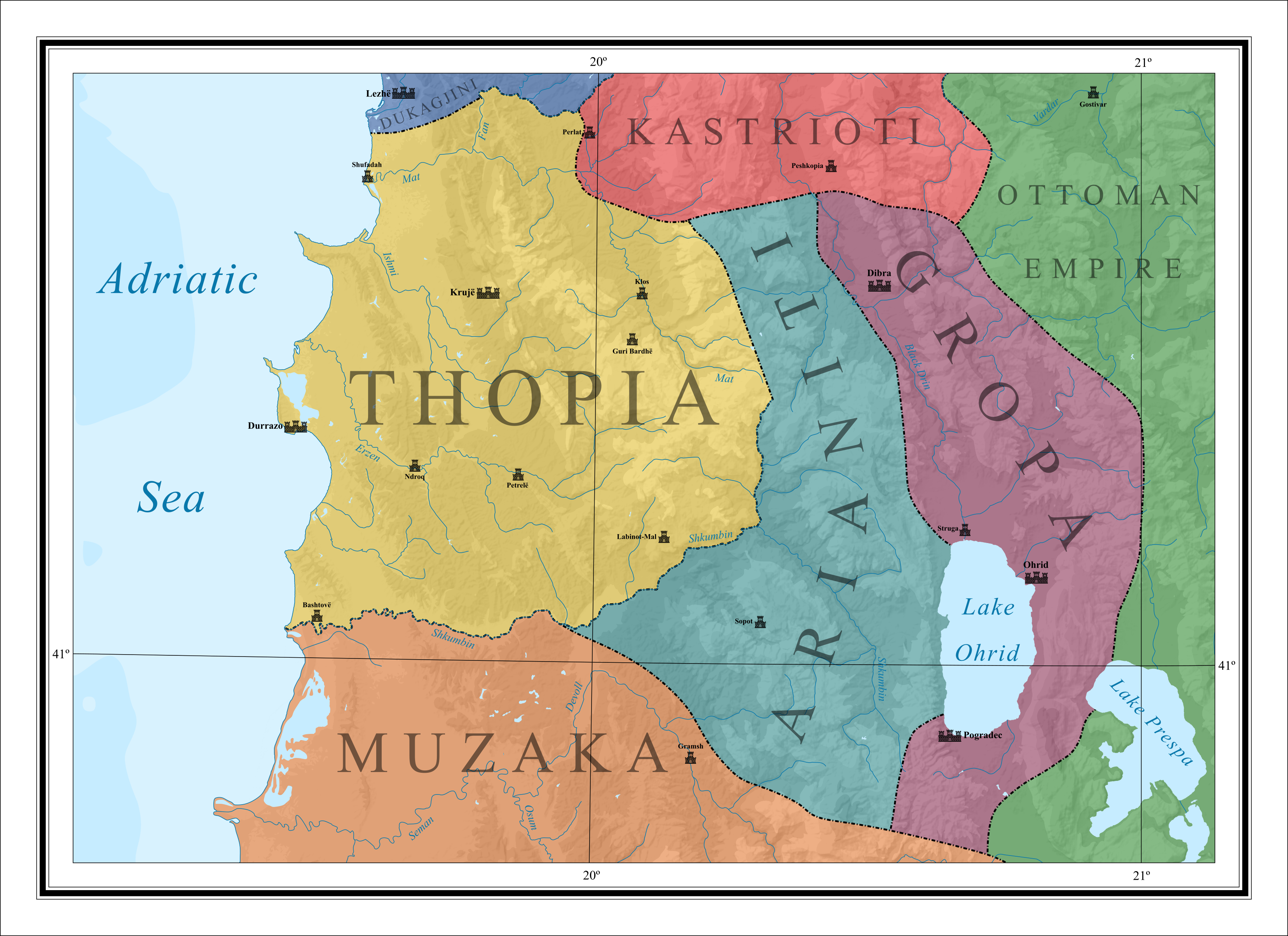
The Principality of Albania, ruled by the Thopias under Gjergj Thopia (between 1385 and 1392).

At the end of 1391, the prince of Albania, Gjergj Thopia, appointed Philip Barelli as his first chamberlain.

On 18 August 1392, during the relinquishment of Durrës from Albanian to Venetian control, Barelli was appointed as the provestiar of the Thopia. He actively participated in the negotiations of the relinquishment. The Archbishop of the city and another citizen of Durrës alongside Barelli travelled during the mid-summer to Venice to finalise the ratification of the treaty.

== Disappearance ==
The Venetian nobleman and count Marco Barbarigo di Croia had married Gjergj’s sister, Helena Thopia, and claimed the city of Krujë, thus being appointed as the city’s new Lord and governor. In 1400, it is recorded that he had raided and plundered Barelli’s house in Cape Rodon, nearby the Venetian Durrës, and his wife was abducted. No further sources ever mention Barelli after the incident.

== Family ==
Barelli had a wife who was abducted in 1400 and her identity remains unknown. His son, Çanino Barelli, appears as an envoy to Ragusa and the Ottomans. Çanino helped open trade channels and secured funding for different Albanian principalities. Çanino is also recorded to have dealt with Albanians who had been imprisoned in Ragusa after fleeing from Ottoman invasions. Because of Çanino’s efforts, Ragusa decided to free the Albanian prisoners and ordered a decree on the ban of Albanian slaves.

== See also ==
- Thopia family
- Lordship of Zeta
- Balšić noble family
- Republic of Venice
