= Thopia family =

Albanian noble family

Thopia Topia, Theopias, Thopias, Topias
- Noble family
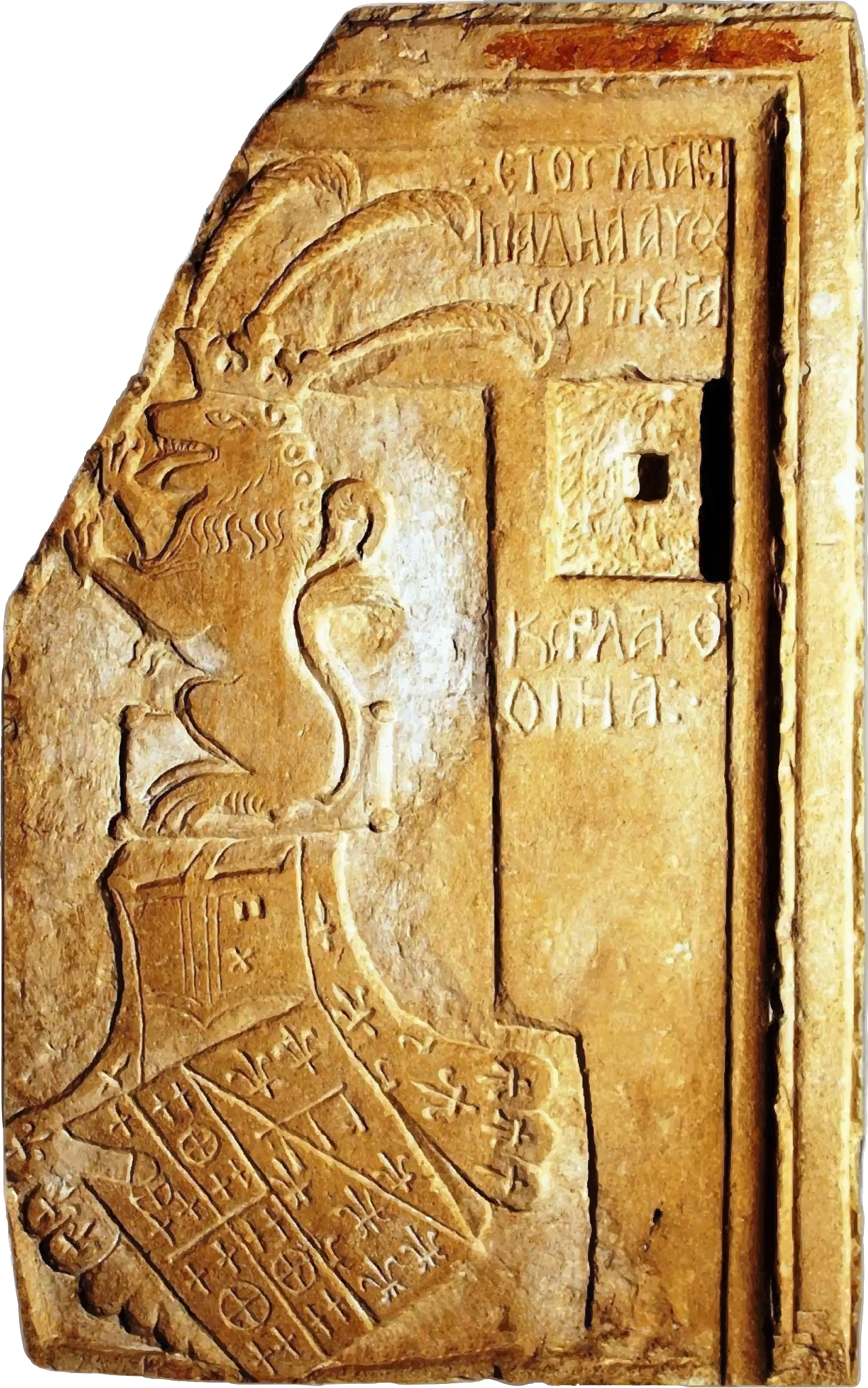
- The stone tablet containing the coat of arms of Karl Thopia found in Saint Gjon Vladimir's Church (1381).
- Country: Principality of Albania
- Founded: 1329
- Founder: Tanusio Thopia
- Final ruler: Niketa Thopia
- Titles: conte (count), lord
- Estates: Between rivers Mat and Shkumbin: Durrës (1368–76; 1383–85; 1385–92); Krujë (1388–1415)
- Dissolution: after 1479
- Cadet branches: Toptani family

The Thopia were one of the most powerful Albanian feudal families in the Late Middle Ages, part of the nobility of the Angevin Kingdom of Albania.

== Early history ==
The first attestation of the Thopia can be found in an Angevin document from 1274 proclaiming an agreement reached between a number of Albanian nobles and Charles I of Anjou. In the document, a certain Theopia mīles is recorded among the Albanian nobles in pact with the Angevins. The Thopia are next mentioned in 1329 when Tanusio Thopia was mentioned as one of the counts of Albania. In 1338, Tanusio was mentioned as Count of Matia (conte di Matia). According to Anamali & Prifti, Tanusio had a brother, Dominik, who was a high cleric and served as a counsel of Robert of Anjou.

According to Karl Hopf, Tanusio's son or brother Andrea, as told by Gjon Muzaka (fl. 1510), had fallen in love with the daughter of Robert of Naples when her ship, en route to the Principality of the Morea to be wed with the bailli, had stopped at Durazzo where they met. Andrea abducted and married her, and they had two sons, Karl and George. An enraged King Robert, on the pretext of reconciliation, invited the couple to Naples where he had them executed.

The family converted from Eastern Orthodoxy to Catholicism.

By 1340 the Thopia controlled much of the territory between the rivers Mati and Shkumbin. Together with the Muzaka family, they agreed to recognize Angevin suzerainty after rebelling against the Serbs. However except for Andrea Muzaka who defeated the Serbs in a battle in the Peristeri mountains, no action was taken to realize the treaty with the Angevins.

== Karl Thopia ==
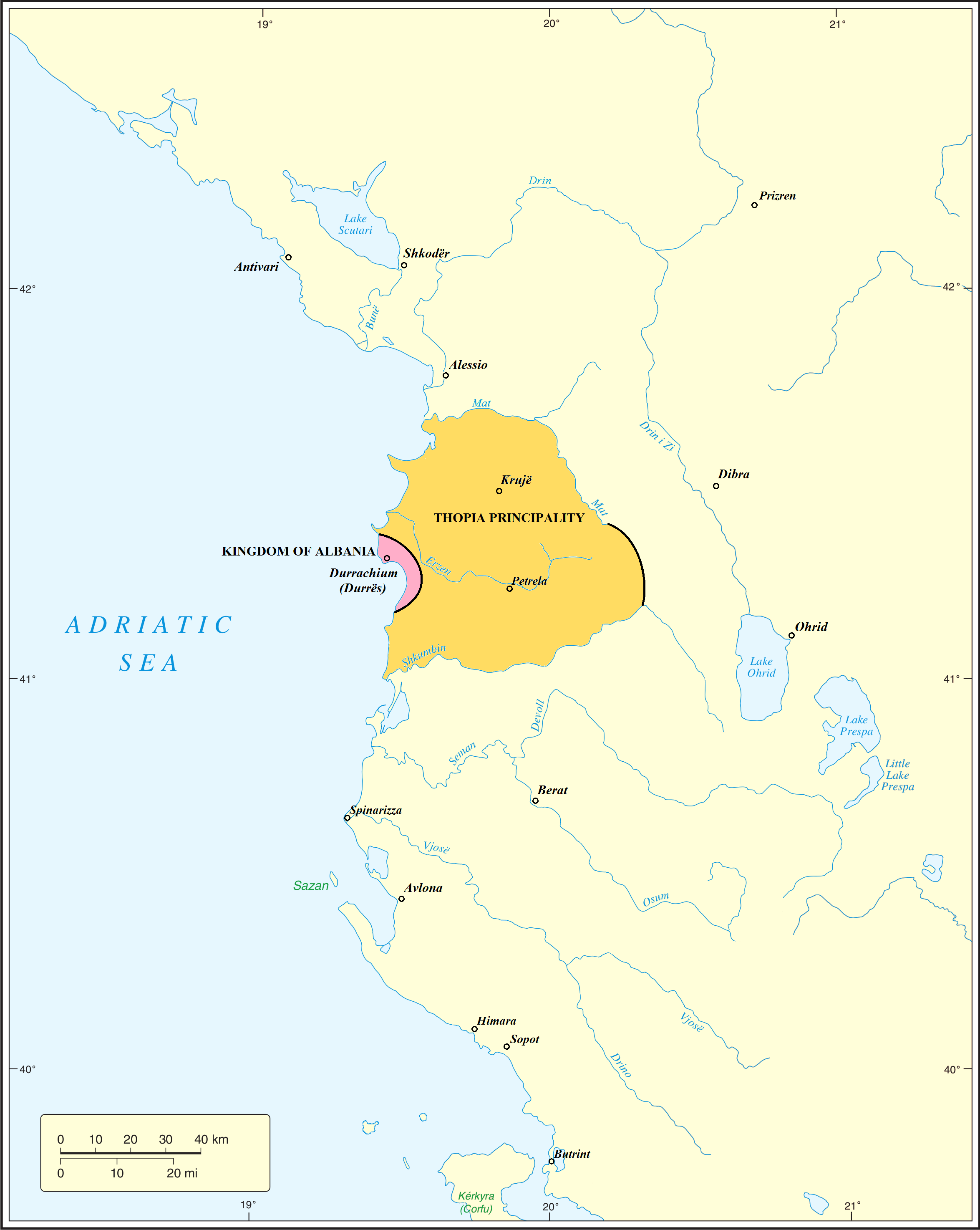
Principality of Albania before Karl Thopia's conquest of Durrës

Under Karl Thopia the family reached its zenith. After the death of Emperor Stefan Dušan (1355), Karl managed to capture much of central Albania which was part of the Serbian Empire until then. In 1362 his forces attacked the city of Durrës, then in Angevin hands. Although he couldn't capture the city, he forced them to pay an annual tribute to his family. In 1368 Karl managed to capture the city of Durrës. Around 1370 Karl attacked the dominions of the Muzaka family and managed to capture from them the territory between the Shkumbin and Seman rivers. Now the territory of Thopia extended from Mat river to the Seman, reaching its maximum extension. This aggressive behavior brought a complicated situation and many enemies. In 1376 Louis of Évreux, Duke of Durazzo who had gained the rights on the Albanian Kingdom from his second wife, attacked and conquered the city. However, in 1383, Karl Thopia took control of the city again.

Muzaka family allied with Balsha II against Thopia. In the beginning of 1385, the city of Durrës was captured by Balsha II in a surprise attack. Karl called for Ottoman help and Balsha's forces were defeated in the Battle of Savra. Thopia recaptured the city of Durrës the same year and held it until his death in 1388. Afterwards, the city of Durrës was inherited by his son Gjergj, Lord of Durrës. In 1392 Gjergj surrendered the city of Durrës and his domains to the Venice.

== After Karl ==
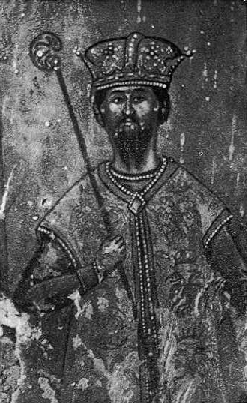
Mural of Karl Thopia found in the Ardenica Monastery.

After the death of Karl, his dominion was divided between his daughter Helena Thopia and his son Gjergj Thopia. Gjergj kept the city of Durrës and his surroundings which he later surrendered to Venice Republic, while Helen Thopia kept the city of Krujë and its surroundings. She was married to Venetian nobleman Marco Barbarigo. The count Niketa Thopia, the half brother of Gjergj, ruled in the region south of Durrës. In 1403, Niketa Thopia managed to capture the city of Krujë from his half sister Helena, thus gaining another part of the territory previously held by Thopia. He had good relations with Venice which was interested in having some buffer zone between them and advancing Ottoman army. However, in 1411, Niketa Thopia suffered a heavy defeat from the forces of Teodor III Muzaka. He himself fell prisoner and with the intervention of Ragusan Republic he was released, but only after giving some territories around Shkumbin river to Muzaka family. Upon his death in 1415, the castle of Krujë fell to the Ottomans.

== Later representatives ==
Later well known representatives include Tanush Thopia, a famous commander of Skanderbeg's army and the commander of the Krujë garrison during the Second Siege of Krujë.

== Members ==
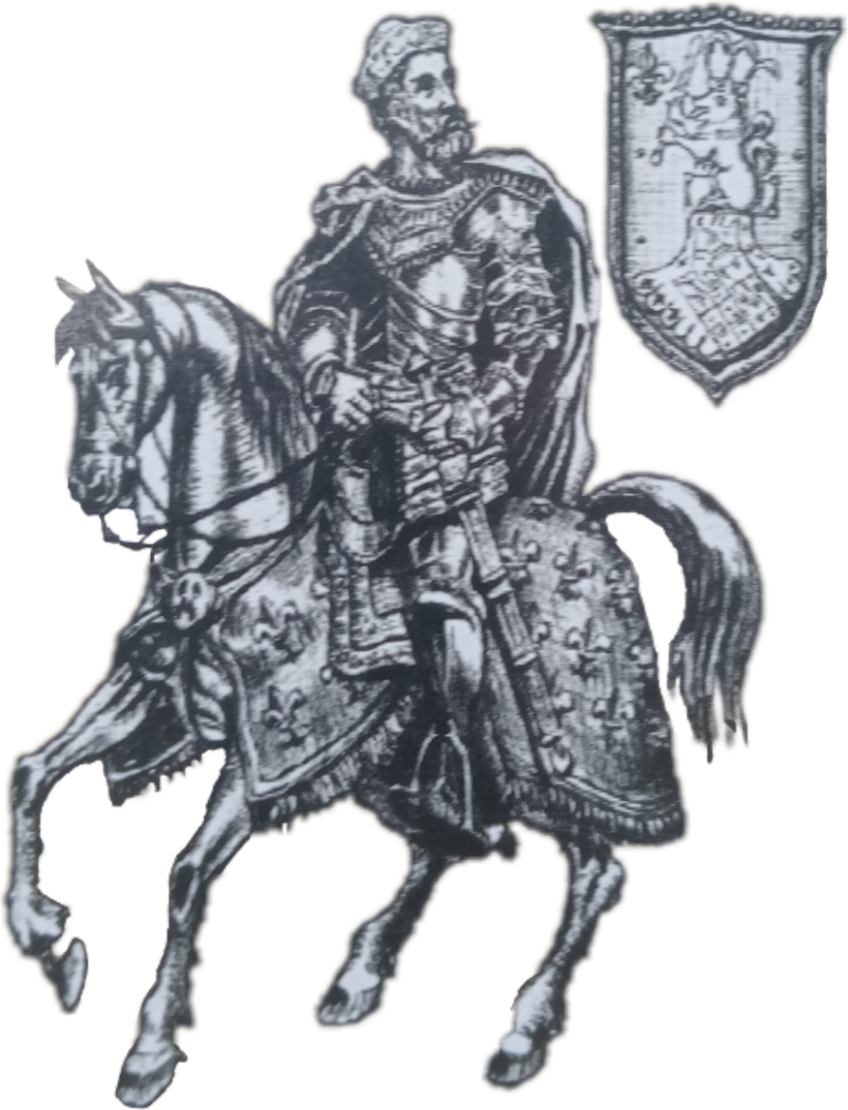
Modern depiction of a Knight of the Thopia Family at the Fortress of Justinian in Tirana

- Sevasto Thopia
  - Tanusio Thopia, Count of Mat
    - Dominic Thopia, Court chaplain and Advisor to King Robert of Naples and Bishop of Korčula & Ston. Archbishop of Zadar and Administer of the Bishop of Bosnia
    - Andrea I Thopia, Count of Mat, married Hélène of Anjou
      - Karl Thopia, Prince of Albania, married Voisava Balsha
        - Gjergj Thopia, Lord of Durrës, married Teodora Branković, no issue
        - Helena Thopia, Lady of Krujë, married Marco Barbadigo then Konstantin Balšić
          - Stefan Maramonte, Zetan lord
        - Voisava Thopia, married Kyr Isaac Cursachio then Progon Dukagjini
      - Gjergj I Thopia
        - Maria Thopia, (Unknown Mother), married Filippo di Maramonte, three children
        - Tanush II Thopia
          - Niketa Thopia, (Unknown Mother), Lord of Krujë, married daughter of Komnen Arianiti
            - Mara Thopia, Lady of Zeta, married Balsha III, one daughter
        - Unknown
          - Tanush Thopia
        - Andrea II Thopia
          - Komnin Thopia
          - Karl Muzakë Thopia, married Zanfina Muzaka then Mamica Kastrioti
            - Andrea III Thopia, (Suina),
            - Yela Thopia, (Suina), married Đurađ Crnojević
            - Yela Thopia, married Andrea Muzaka
            - Unknown Daughter
            - Gjon Thopia
            - Gjergj Thopia
            - Ali Bej Toptani
            - Unknown Son

== See also ==
- Principality of Albania (medieval)
- Saint Gjon Vladimir's Church
