= Stefan Maramonte =

Zetan nobleman

Stefan Balšić Maramonte Stefan Balsha Shtjefën Balsha
- Lord
- Born: before 1402
- Died: after 1440
- Noble family: Balšić noble family
- Father: Konstantin Balšić
- Mother: Helena Thopia

Stefan Balšić (Serbian Cyrillic: Стефан Балшић; Albanian: Stefan Balsha or Shtjefën Balsha); fl. 1419-40, known as Stefan Maramonte, was a Zetan nobleman. He was the son of Konstantin Balšić and Helena Thopia. Following Konstantin's death in 1402, Helena sought refuge in the Republic of Venice and later lived with her sister Maria Thopia who was married to Philip Maramonte. As a result, the Venetians and Ragusans often referred to Stefan as Maramonte. He was initially a close associate and vassal to Zetan lord Balša III (r. 1403-1421). Balša III and Stefan fought against the Republic of Venice, and Stefan helped in the administration of the land as co-ruler with Balša III, he did however not succeed Balša III. Balša III, who died on 28 April 1421, had decided to pass the rule of Zeta to his uncle, the Serbian Despot Stefan Lazarević. When the Second Scutari War between Venice and Despot Stefan began, he [...]. Stefan left Apulia in the summer of 1426, seeking to take Zeta. During the 1427–28 conflict, Maramonte went to the Ottoman court where he sought the support of Sultan Murad II for his appointment as the Lord of Zeta. There, he met Skanderbeg, who was a hostage at the Ottoman court. Maramonte married Vlajka Kastrioti, the sister of Skanderbeg. Supported by the Ottomans, Maramonte, accompanied by Gojčin Crnojević and Little Tanush, plundered the region around Scutari and Ulcinj, and attacked Drivast in 1429, but failed to capture it. Since his attempts failed, Maramonte surrendered to the Venetians and served as their military officer in the campaigns in Flanders and Lombardy.

== Ancestry ==
Ancestors of Stefan Maramonte

8. Balša I
4. Đurađ I Balšić
2. Konstantin Balšić
10. Dejan
5. Teodora Dejanović
22. Stephen Uroš III Dečanski of Serbia
11. Teodora-Evdokija
23. Maria Palaiologina, Queen of Serbia
1. Stefan Balšić (Maramonte)
24. Tanusio Thopia
12. Andrea I Thopia
6. Karl Topia
26. Robert, King of Naples
13. Hélène of Anjou
27. Unnamed mistress
3. Helena Thopia
14. Balša I
7. Voisava Balšić

== Annotations ==
- His name was Stefan Balsha (Latin: Stephanus de Balsis), but he was called Stefan Maramonte (sr. Stefan Crnogorac, de. Stephan Czernogoraz), meaning "Stefan from the Black Mountain (Montenegro)" (Latin: Stephanus de Maramonte Zarnagorae).
