= Voisava Balšić =

Medieval Albanian noblewoman of the Balsha family

Voisava Balšić Voisava Balsha
- Princess of Albania; Princess of Zeta
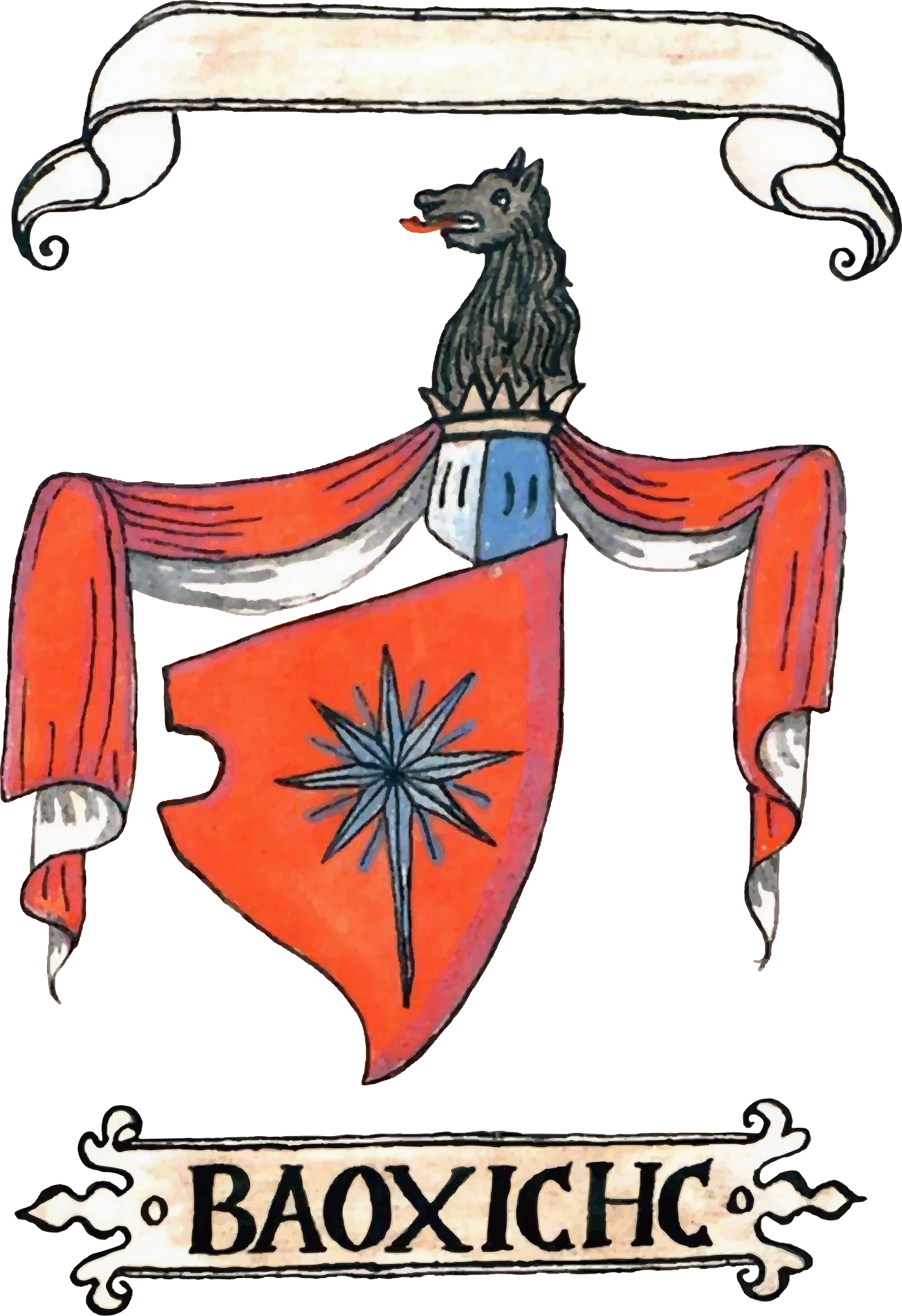
- Coat of Arms of the Balsha family

Princess consort of Albania
- Tenure: 1370–1388
- Predecessor: Hélène of Anjou (As Countess of Mat)
- Successor: Teodora Branković
- Born: 14th Century; Principality of Zeta
- Spouse: Karl Thopia (m. 1370; died 1388)
- Issue: Gjergj Thopia; Helena Thopia; Voisava Thopia
- House: Balšić
- Father: Balša I
- Mother: Unknown

Voisava Balšić (Serbian Cyrillic: Воисава Балшић; Albanian: Voisava Balsha), also known as Vojislava, Vojsava or Voislava was a noble woman related to the Balšić noble family.

== Life ==
Voisava was the daughter of Balša I, a provincial lord who held the title Lord of Zeta. Her mother's identity remains unknown, and details about her early life are scarce. She was married to Karl Thopia, Prince of Albania around the year 1370.

Her husband Karl Thopia died in 1388, where he was buried in St. Jovan Vladimir's Church. Their son, Gjergj Thopia, became Karl's successor.

== Family ==
Voisava married Karl Thopia, in c. 1370. The pair had three children:

- Gjergj Thopia (fl. 1388–d. 1392), Prince of Albania, Lord of Durrës, married Teodora Branković
- Helena Thopia (fl. 1388–1403), married Venetian count Marco Barbadigo (first marriage) and lord Kostandin Balsha (second marriage)
- Voisava Thopia, married N. Cursachio (first marriage) and in 1394, Progon Dukagjini, Lord of Lezhë and uncle of Pal Dukagjini (second marriage)

== Bibliography ==
- Anamali, Skënder (2002). Historia e popullit shqiptar [The history of the Albanian people] (in Albanian). Botimet Toena. ISBN 978-9-9927-1622-9.
- Elsie, Robert (2003). Early Albania A Reader of Historical Texts, 11th-17th Centuries. Harrassowitz. ISBN 978-3-4470-4783-8.
- Hopf, Karl (1873). Chroniques greco-romanes inedites ou peu connues [Unpublished or little-known Greco-Roman chronicles] (in French). Weidmann.
- Jacques, Edwin E. (2009). The Albanians: An Ethnic History from Prehistoric Times to the Present - Volume 1. McFarland & Company. ISBN 978-0-8995-0932-7.
- Molina, Grabiela Rojas (2022). Decoding Debate in the Venetian Senate Short Stories of Crisis and Response on Albania (1392-1402). Brill. ISBN 978-9-0045-2093-6.
- Numismatischer Verlag Fritz-Rudolf Künker (2008). Künker Auktion 137 - The De Wit Collection of Medieval Coins, 1000 Years of European Coinage, Part III: England, Ireland, Scotland, Spain, Portugal, Italy, Balkan, the Middle East, Crusader States, Jetons und Weights. Numismatischer Verlag Künker.
- Sainty, Guy Stair (2018). The Constantinian Order of Saint George and the Angeli, Farnese and Bourbon families which governed it. Boletín Oficial del Estado. ISBN 978-8-4340-2506-6.
