= Helena Thopia =

14th-century Albanian noblewoman

- Lady of Krujë
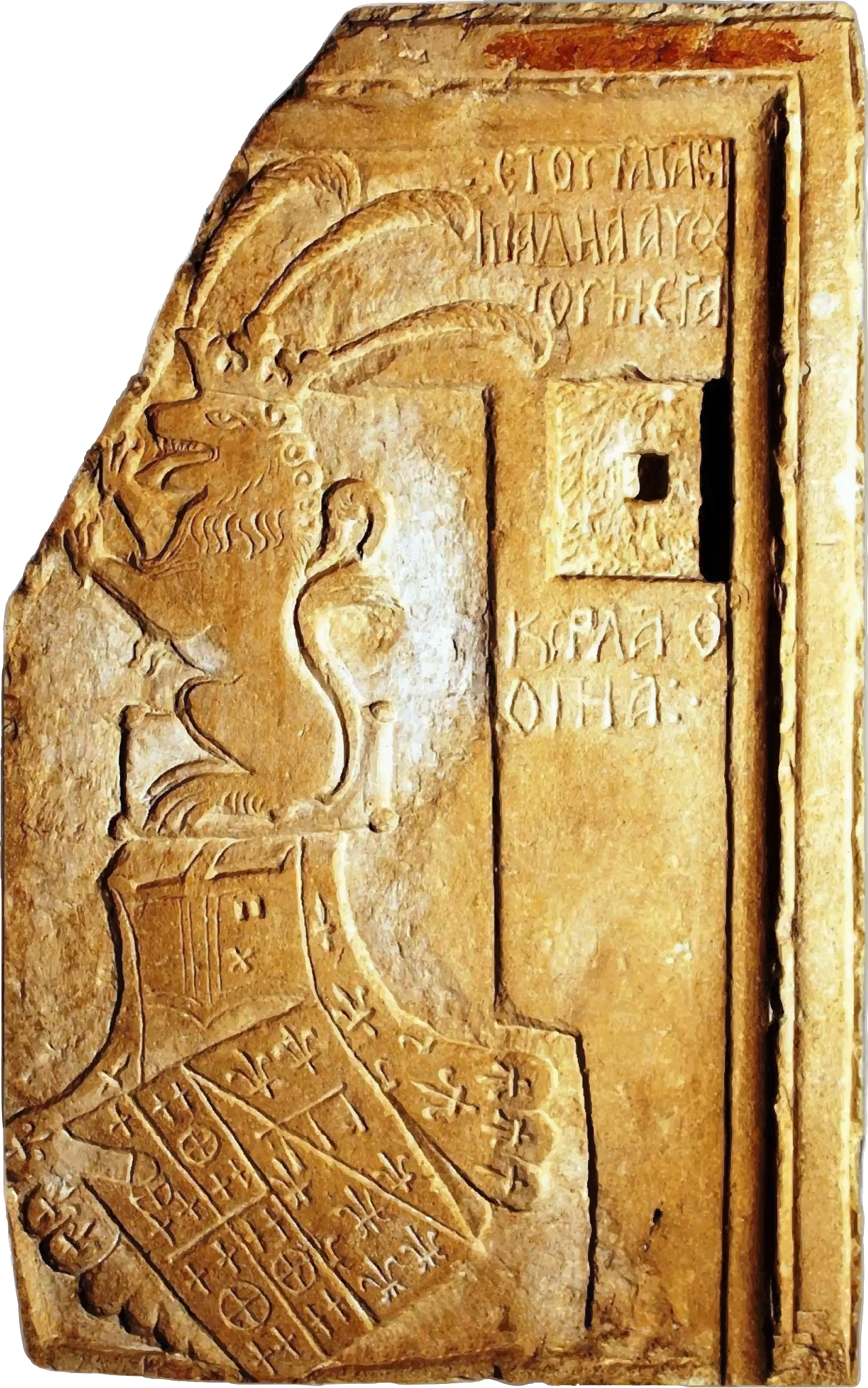
- Coat of arms of the Thopia family

Lady of Krujë
- Reign: 1388 – 1392 (First reign) with Marco Barbarigo as a Venetian Vassal then Ottoman Vassal; 1394 – 1402 (Second reign) with Kostandin Balsha as an Ottoman Vassal; 1402 - 1403 (Third reign)
- Predecessor: Karl Thopia
- Successor: Niketa Thopia
- Born: c. 1370s Principality of Albania
- Spouses: Marco Barbarigo (m. 1388; ann. 1394) Kostandin Balsha (m. 1394; died 1402)
- Issue: Stefan Maramonte
- House: Thopia family
- Father: Karl Thopia
- Mother: Voisava Balsha
- Religion: Roman Catholic

Helena Thopia (Albanian: Helena Topia; fl. 1388–1403) was an Albanian princess of the Thopia family who held the Krujë region as sovereign lady for two terms; 1388–1392 and 1394–1403.

== Life ==
Princess Helena, was the eldest daughter of Karl Thopia and Voisava Balsha. After the death of her father, in 1388, she inherited the castle of Krujë and the surrounding region. Her first marriage was to Marco Barbarigo a Venetian nobleman, who became the actual ruler of her lands. Mark held for a time his and Helen's possession under Venetian suzerainty. Mark, who had previously held his and Helen's possessions under Venetian suzerainty, found himself facing a new threat from the Ottomans. These pressures eventually led him to accept Ottoman suzerainty, allowing him to maintain his control over Krujë and his other lands stretching to Durrës. No longer viewing himself as a Venetian deputy, he began to raid Venetian lands in the vicinity of Durrës. In 1392 as a result of the hostilities between her husband and the Venetian forces, her half-brother, Niketa Thopia, a Venice loyal, attacked the city of Krujë and forced Mark Barbarigo to find refuge among the Balsha family.

After her brother Gjergj Thopia died in 1392 she gained the bulk of the rest of his holdings. A smaller portion was also left to their younger sister, Voisava Thopia.

In 1394, Kostandin Balsha, was appointed by the Ottomans to govern Krujë. In 1395, Kostandin was actively fighting for the Ottomans at the Battle of Rovine. The Venetians, displeased by the shift in control, attempted to negotiate with Kostandin to regain Krujë, but he refused. Kostandin soon married Helen Thopia, the widow of Mark Barbadigo and the holder of Krujë's hereditary rights. Kostandin's mother, Teodora Dejanović who was now a nun, joined him in Krujë, taking an active role at court. Shortly thereafter, Kostandin also gained control of the town of Danjë, which included its lucrative customs post. In 1402, while many Albanian vassals of the Ottomans went to support Bayezid I against Timur at the Battle of Ankara, Kostandin Balsha remained in Albania. He soon launched an attack against Venice's Durrës, which ultimately failed, leading to his capture. The Venetians then tried him and executed him.

In 1403, Niketa Thopia swiftly seized control of the city of Krujë from his sister Helena, acting independently. Given his prior loyalty to the Venetians, they soon accepted his action and, in 1404, officially recognized him as governor of Krujë.

After Kostandin's death Helena and their son Shtjefën Balsha first went to Venice and then lived with her sister Maria, Baroness of Botrugno.

== Family ==
Helena Thopia married Kostandin Balsha. The couple had one child:

1. Stefan Balsha "Maramonte", was a Zetan nobleman who served as a close associate and vassal to Balša III, but later sought Ottoman support for his rule over Zeta.

== Ancestry ==
Ancestors of Helena Thopia

16. Sevasto Thopia
8. Tanusio Thopia
4. Andrea Thopia
2. Karl Thopia
40. Charles I of Anjou
20. Charles II of Naples
41. Beatrice of Provence
10. Robert, King of Naples
42. Stephen V of Hungary
21. Mary of Hungary
43. Elizabeth the Cuman
5. Hélène of Anjou
1. Helena Thopia
6. Balsha I
3. Voisava Balsha

== See also ==
- Thopia family
- Principality of Albania (medieval)
- Saint Gjon Vladimir's Church

Preceded by Karl Topia as Prince of Albania	Lady of Krujë; 1388–92; Served alongside: Marco Barbarigo di Croia	Succeeded by Niketa Thopia as Lord
Preceded by Kostandin Balsha	Lady of Krujë; 1394–1403; Served alongside: Kostandin Balsha (1402†)	Succeeded by Niketa Thopia as Lord
