= Voisava Thopia =

Voisava Thopia Vojsava Topia
- Lady of Lezhë

Lady of Lezhë
- Tenure: 13??-????
- Born: c. 1370s Principality of Albania
- Spouse: Lord Isaac Cursachio; Progon Dukagjini
- House: Thopia
- Father: Karl Thopia
- Mother: Voisava Balsha

Voisava Thopia (Albanian: Vojsava Topia), also known as Voyasclava, Vojislava, Voyslava or Voisclava was an Albanian princess of the Thopia family.

== Life ==
Princess Voisava, was the daughter of Karl Thopia and Voisava Balsha. Not much is known about the early life of Voisava Thopia. Her first marriage was to Lord Isaac Cursachio who was a patrician of Durrës. In 1392 her brother Gjergj Thopia was forced to surrender Durrës to the Republic of Venice and in the same year, he died without issue. The rest of his holdings went to their older sister Helena Thopia who got the bulk and herself who got a small piece. It is not known what happened to her first husband Lord Isaac Cursachio, but she was remarried to Progon Dukagjini who was the Lord of Lezhë.

Progon Dukagjini, Voisava's husband, presented several petitions on behalf of himself and her during his visit to Venice in August 1393. Among the ten requests he made, one included the return of precious items belonging to Gjergj Thopia, Voisava's older brother, which were held by the commune. This request was likely made on Voisava's behalf.

On October 24, 1398, Voisava Thopia claimed her brother’s citizenship rights, which granted her the legal entitlement to own property in Durrës, though it is unclear whether these rights originally belonged to her brother Gjergj Thopia or Niketa Thopia.

== See also ==
- Thopia family
- Principality of Albania (medieval)
- Saint Gjon Vladimir's Church
