= Karl Thopia =

14th-century Albanian prince and warlord

Karl Thopia Karl Topia
- Prince of Albania; Grand Count of Albania; Duke of Durrës; Lord of Krujë
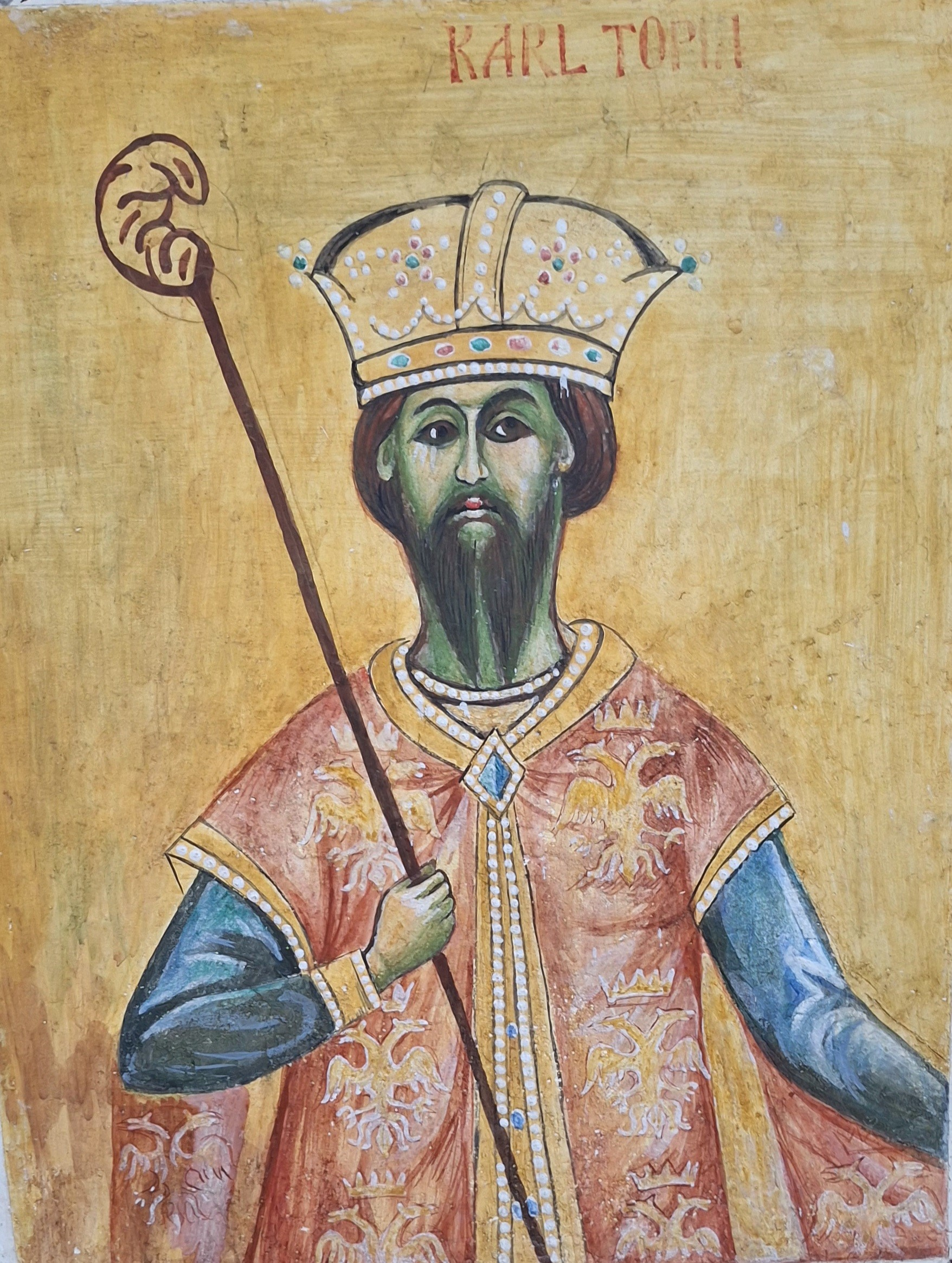
- Portrait of Karl Thopia at the Skanderbeg Museum.

Prince of Albania & Duke of Durrës
- Reign: 1358–1388
- Predecessor: Andrea I Thopia
- Successor: Gjergj Thopia

Lord of Krujë
- Reign: 1358–1388
- Successor: Helena Thopia
- Born: c. 1339; Durrës, Princedom of Albania
- Died: January 1388 (aged 57); Elbasan, Princedom of Albania
- Burial: St. Gjon Vladimir's Church
- Spouse: Voisava Balsha (m. 1370)
- Issue: Gjergj Thopia; Helena Thopia; Voisava Thopia; Maria Thopia; Niketa Thopia
- Dynasty: Thopia; Anjou-Naples
- Father: Andrea I Thopia
- Mother: Hélène of Anjou
- Religion: Roman Catholic

Karl Thopia (Albanian: Karl Topia; c. 1339 – January 1388) sometimes written as Charles Thopia, was an Albanian feudal prince and warlord who ruled Albanian domains from 1358 until the first Ottoman conquest of Albania in 1388. Thopia usually maintained good relations with the Roman Curia.

== Family ==
The first mention of the Thopia family is from 1329, when Tanusio Thopia was mentioned as one of the counts of Albania. In 1338, Tanusio was mentioned as Count of Mat (conte di Matia). According to Karl Hopf, Tanusio's son or brother Andrea I, as told by Gjon Muzaka (fl. 1510), had fallen in love with Hélène of Anjou, illegitimate daughter of King Robert of Naples when her ship, en route to the Principality of the Morea to be wed with the bailli, had stopped at Durrës where they met. Andrea abducted and married her, and they had two sons, Karl and George. Karl was named after his great great grandfather Charles I of Anjou. King Robert, enraged, under the pretext of reconciliation, invited the couple to Naples where he had them executed. Karl Thopia is first mentioned in 1350, at a time when Anjou still owned Durrës.

== Control of Durrës and the Princedom of Albania ==
The long protracted turmoil of dynastic wars had made germinate in their real victims, the Albanians, the seeds of national sentiment which contained great promise, so that, when after Emperor Stefan Dušan's death, a descendant of Stefan Uroš I, returned to the province, the inhabitants rose en masse and, under the leadership of Karl Thopia, cut down the pretender and his entire force in the battle of Acheloos.

In 1358, Karl rose against the rule of the Anjou and managed to drive them out of Durrës from Epirus and Albania. He ruled most of modern central Albania from 1358 to 1388 and held the title of Princeps Albaniae (Prince of Albania) and Duke of Durrës.

Since 1362, Karl sought Durrës, which was in the possession of Joanna, Duchess of Durazzo. The first, certainly still unsuccessful siege lasted from April 1362 to May 1363. Then, Thopia had to withdraw his troops, who were weakened by an epidemic disease. Only in 1367 could Karl conquer Durrës, who had attained in the meantime the tacit agreement of the Venetians for his project and turn this important port into his residence.

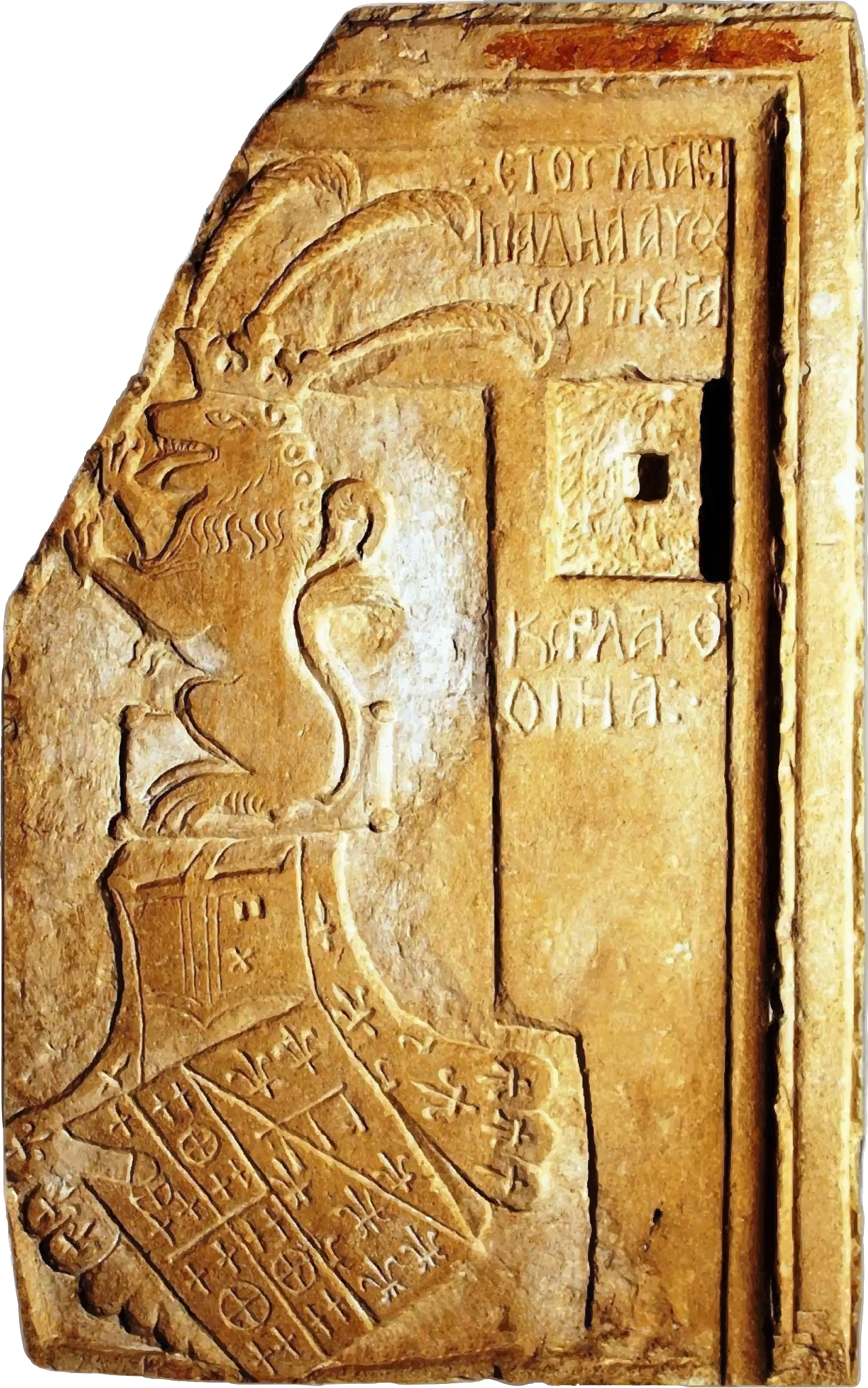
Stone engraving attributed to Karl Thopia, found in Saint Gjon Vladimir's Church (1381)

Karl gained control of Durrës in 1368, which was where the Angevins held out due to their Kingdom becoming smaller in size. In 1374, Pope Gregory XI awarded him the title "Grande Conte d'Albania" (Grand Count of Albania). Karl lost Durrës in 1376, conquered by Joanna's husband Louis during the Durrës Expedition, but recovered it in 1383 when the last mercenaries of the Navarrese Company moved to Greece.

Thopia ruled over the regions of Durrës, Kruja, Peqin, Elbasan, Mokra and Gora, that is, along both sides of the Via Egnatia as far east as Lake Ohrid.

== Rivalry with Balsha II ==
Balsha II and the Thopia had been fighting for the control of the region between Lake Skadar and Durrës since 1363. Balsha, allied with the Albanian tribe Mataruge, tried to invade Albania in 1364. In the summer of the same year, Balsha was defeated by Karl and Gjergj I Balsha was captured in a skirmish. It would not be until 1366 that Republic of Ragusa would mediate peace between them and procured the release of Balsha II. In 1380, Karl Thopia tried to make an alliance with King Louis I of Hungary, who confirmed it in the possessions he had in Durrës and the surrounding area. This alliance was not welcomed by either the Venetians or the Roman Curia, as long as the Hungarian king supported Avignon's antipope. Rejecting Charles's legitimacy over Durrës, the Pope turned his brother-in-law Balsha II against him.

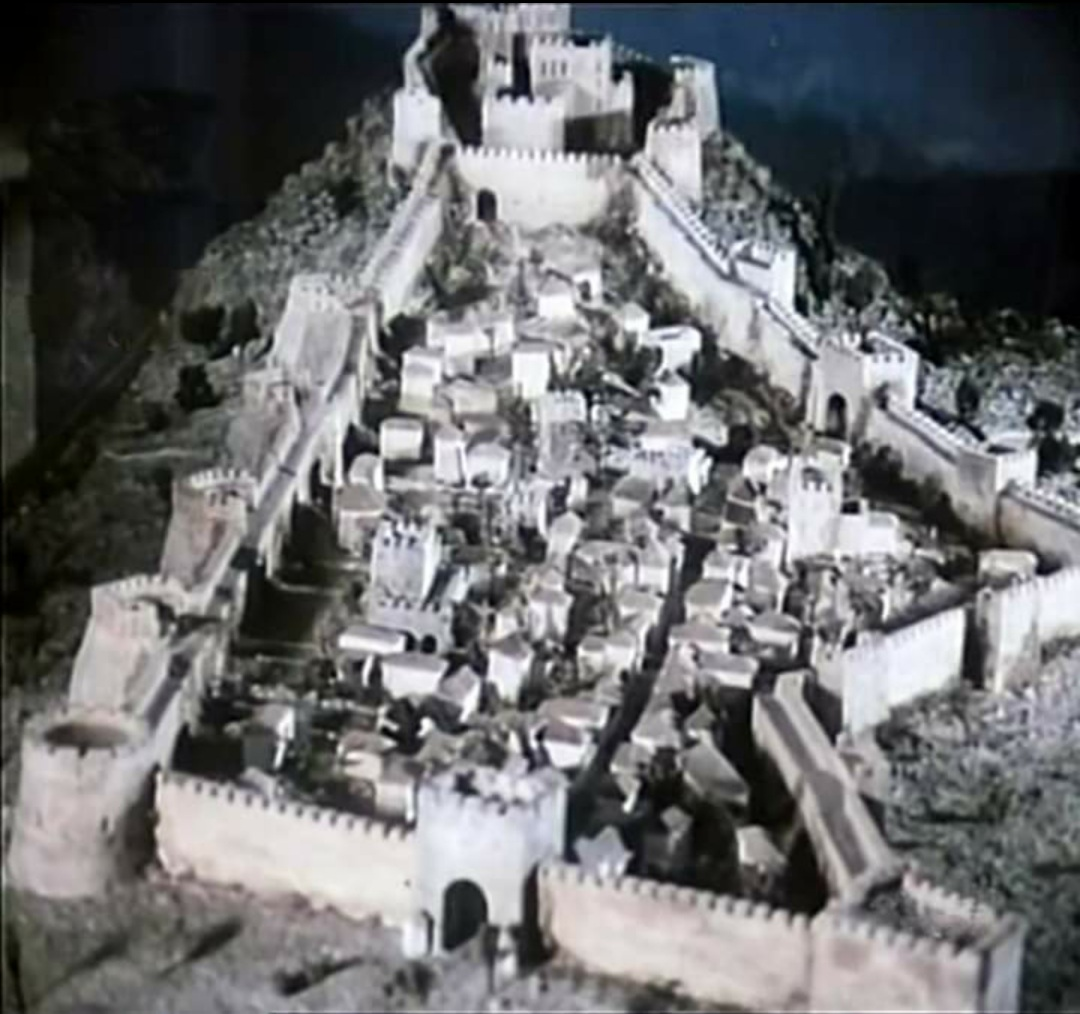
Model of Durrës Castle during the Medieval era.

Balsha II made a fourth attempt to conquer Durrës, an important commercial and strategic center, which was ruled by his rival, Karl Thopia. In 1385, Balsha II started an offensive, capturing Durrës from Karl Thopia the following year, and proclaimed himself Duke of Durazzo (Durrës). Thopia called on the Turks for assistance. Murad I gladly sent an army of 40,000 men from Macedonia. In the plain of Savra between Elbasan and Lushnjë, Balsha II fought the Turks and was defeated and killed. Thopia again gained control over Durrës, probably under Ottoman suzerainty.

== Venetian alliance ==
In the last decade of his rule, Karl closely followed the Republic of Venice, particularly with regard to foreign policy. On 17 August 1386, Karl Thopia allied himself with Venice and committed himself to participate in all wars of the Republic or pay auxiliary funds and supply grain. In addition, he promised the Venetian buyers protection in his lands. In return, Venice supplied a galley, permitted recruitment of Thopia's mercenaries in Venetian areas and instructed the captain of their Adriatic fleet to protect Karl's coasts from the Ottomans. The Ottomans undertook several heavy attacks on Durrës, which also still persisted as Karl died in January 1388, where he was buried in St. Jovan Vladimir's Church. His son, Gjergj Thopia, became Karl's successor.

== Foundations ==
=== St. Gjon Vladimir’s Church ===
In 1381, Karl built the St. Gjon Vladimir's Church in the proximity of Elbasan, where Jovan Vladimir's remains were held until 1995. He is depicted in the icon scenes of the life of Saint Jovan Vladimir, painted by Onufri, wearing a crown and standing by the Church of the Saint.

Inscriptions:

- A calligraphic inscription in Greek says: "ΚΑΡΛΑ ΘΕΩΠΙΑϹ ΚΑΙ ΚΤΗΤΩΡ ΤΗϹ ΑΓΙΑϹ ΜΟΝΗϹ ΤΟΥ ΑΓΙΟΥ" (Karla Theopias, builder of the Holy Monastery of the Saint).
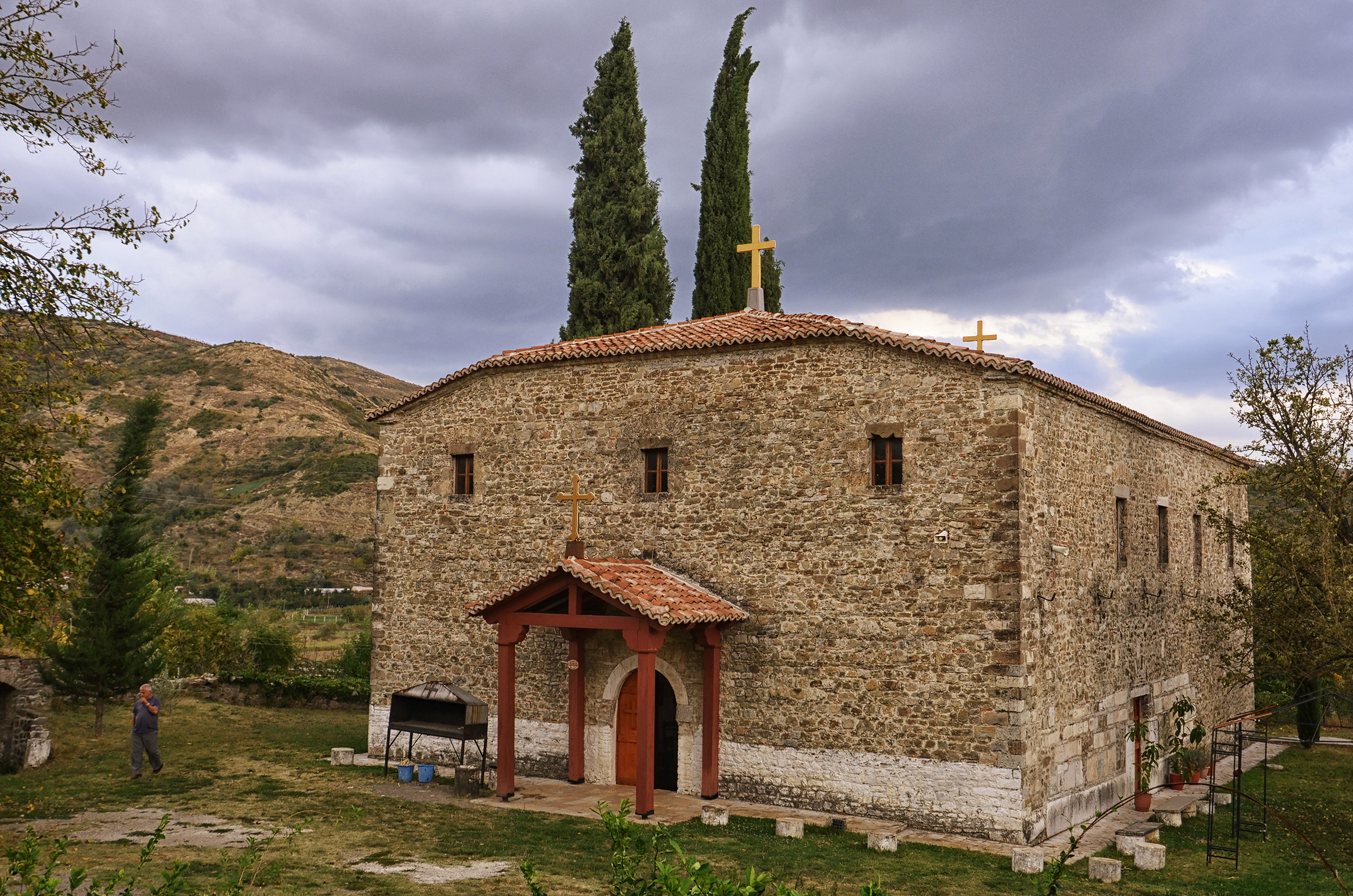
- The St. Gjon Vladimir's Church was founded by Karl Thopia
  Another Greek inscription in the building refers to him as: "... ο πανυψηλώτατος πρώτος Κάρλας Θεωπίας ανεψιός δε και αίματος ρύγας της Φραγγίας... οικοδόμησεν τον πάνσεπτον ναόν τούτον του αγίου Ιωάννου του Βλαδιμήρου ..." (the highest and prime Karlas Theopias, nephew and by blood king of Francia ... built this holy church of St. John Vladimir ... ) dated 1382. This inscription is currently located in the Albanian Historical Museum in Tirana.
- "These signs of a great lord ... Carla Thopea" (ετούτα τα σιμάδηα αυθέντου μέγα ... Κάρλα Θοπήα).

=== Church of St. Celment and Panteleimon ===
According to Macedonian researcher Cvetan Grodzanov, Karl Thopia made significant contributions to reconstruct the church of saints Clement and Panteleimon in Ohrid. According to another author, in the northern narthex of the church, near the entrance to the nave, a fragment of a fresco depicts a double-headed eagle and near the neck is drawn the triple lily, the heraldic symbol of the coat of arms of the royal family of the Angevins of France, which Karl Thopia was related to maternally. The same coat of arms can be found on the portrait of Karl painted by Kostandin Shpataraku. Author V. Moshin claims that during the year 1380, the elder Gervasije, the abbot of the church, together with his brothers, addressed Karl Topia as the new Ktitor.

== Issue ==
Karl married Voisava Balsha, in c. 1370. The pair had three children:

- Gjergj Thopia (fl. 1388–d. 1392), Lord of Durrës (Durazzo), married Teodora Branković
- Helena Thopia (fl. 1388–1403), married Venetian count Marco Barbadigo (first marriage) and lord Kostandin Balsha (second marriage)
- Voisava Thopia, married N. Cursachio (first marriage) and in 1394, Progon Dukagjini, Lord of Lezhë and uncle of Pal Dukagjini (second marriage)

Karl had two more children but the parentage is unknown:

- Maria Thopia, married Filippo di Maramonte
- Niketa Thopia, married a daughter of Komnen Arianiti.

== Family tree ==
Ancestors of Karl Thopia

8. Sevasto Thopia
4. Tanusio Thopia
9. Unknown
2. Andrea I Thopia
10. Unknown
5. Unknown
11. Unknown
1. Karl Thopia
48. Louis VIII of France
24. Charles I of Anjou
49. Blanche of Castile
12. Charles II of Naples
50. Ramon Berenguer V, Count of Provence
25. Beatrice of Provence
51. Beatrice of Savoy
6. Robert, King of Naples
52. Béla IV of Hungary
26. Stephen V of Hungary
53. Maria Laskarina
13. Mary of Hungary, Queen of Naples
54. Köten
27. Elizabeth the Cuman
3. Hélène of Anjou
14. Unknown
7. Unknown Mistress
15. Unknown

== See also ==
- Thopia family
- Principality of Albania (medieval)
- Saint Gjon Vladimir's Church

== Sources ==
- Fine, John V. A. (1994). The Late Medieval Balkans: A Critical Survey from the Late Twelfth Century to the Ottoman Conquest. University of Michigan Press. ISBN 0-472-08260-4.

Regnal titles
Preceded by Karl Thopia	Lord of Krujë; 1355–1388	Succeeded by Helena Thopia
Preceded by Joanna of Durrës as Duchess of Durrës	Prince of Albania; 1368–1383	Succeeded by Balsha II
Preceded by Karl Thopia	Prince of Albania; 1385–1388	Succeeded by Gjergj Thopia
