= Andrea I Thopia =

Albanian nobleman

Andrea I Thopia Andrea I Topia
- Count of Mat

Count of Mat
- Reign: 1338–1342
- Predecessor: Tanush Thopia
- Successor: Karl Thopia (as Prince of Albania)
- Died: 1342; Neapolitan court
- Spouses: Hélène of Anjou
- Issue: Karl Thopia; Gjergj Thopia
- House: Thopia
- Father: Tanusio Thopia
- Mother: Unknown

Andrea I Thopia (Albanian: Andrea I Topia) died in 1342 in Naples was an Albanian nobleman. In 1338 he inherited the county of Mat from his predecessor Tanusio Thopia.

== Life ==
Andrea had become the son-in-law of the Neapolitan King Robert of Anjou without his consent. It would end up costing him his life. Robert sent his biological daughter Hélène of Anjou, whom he had promised to be a wife to a potentate in Morea, via Durrës to Greece. In the Albanian port city she met Andreas Thopia, they fell in love and got married. The marriage resulted in two sons, Karl Thopia and Gjergj Thopia. However, King Robert did not accept the violation of his will to rule. He invited the couple to Naples on the pretext of wanting to reconcile with them and had them executed there.

The sons who remained in Albania survived, and so Prince Karl Thopia was later able to rightly invoke his family ties to a royal house, even though he pursued a policy directed against Anjou throughout his life, because he was not able forgive the one who killed his parents.

== See also ==
- Thopia family
- Principality of Albania (medieval)
- Saint Gjon Vladimir's Church
