= Konstantin Balšić =

14th-century Albanian-Serbian nobleman

Konstantin Balšić Константин Балшић Kostandin Balsha
- Lord of Krujë, Danjë, Shkodër, etc.
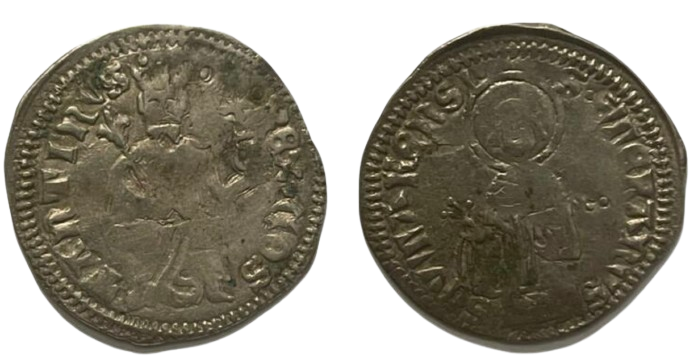
- During his short rule, Konstantin Balšić minted a single coin: reverse (left) shows him seated as king, obverse (right) shows Saint Stephen with a gospel and censer, both with Latin inscriptions.
- Reign: 1394–1402
- Successor: Helena Thopia
- Born: c. 1370
- Died: 1402; Durrës or Shkodër, Venetian Albania
- Noble family: Balšić
- Spouse: Helena Thopia
- Issue: Stefan Maramonte
- Father: Đurađ I Balšić
- Mother: Teodora Dejanović

Konstantin Balšić (Serbian Cyrillic: Константин Балшић; Albanian: Kostandin Balsha) also known as Kostadin or Constantine was a 14th-century Albanian-Serbian nobleman from the House of Balšić, who ruled over territories in northern Albania and Zeta. He became an Ottoman vassal and ruled over Krujë and Danjë, and was executed by the Republic of Venice in 1402 following his failed attack on Durrës.

== Early life ==
Zeta during the rule of Đurađ I Balšić and his brother Strazimir Balšić, circa 1370s.

Konstantin Balšić, born in the 1370s, was the son of Đurađ I Balšić, Lord of Zeta, and his second wife Teodora Dejanović, a member of the Dejanović family.

A few years after Konstantin’s birth, his father, Đurađ I, died in Shkodër on 13 January 1378, and his uncle, Balša II, succeeded as Lord of Zeta without any challenge. It isn't fully clear if Đurađ I intended for Konstantin to inherit any portion of the Principality of Zeta or to receive an Appanage. Relations between Konstantin and his uncle seem to have been distant, as his uncle ignored any claims Konstantin may have had on Zeta. After his fathers death his mother Teodora Dejanović remained active politically and continued to rule over a substantial territory between the Drin and Buna rivers, where she resided with her son.

== Rule and marriage ==
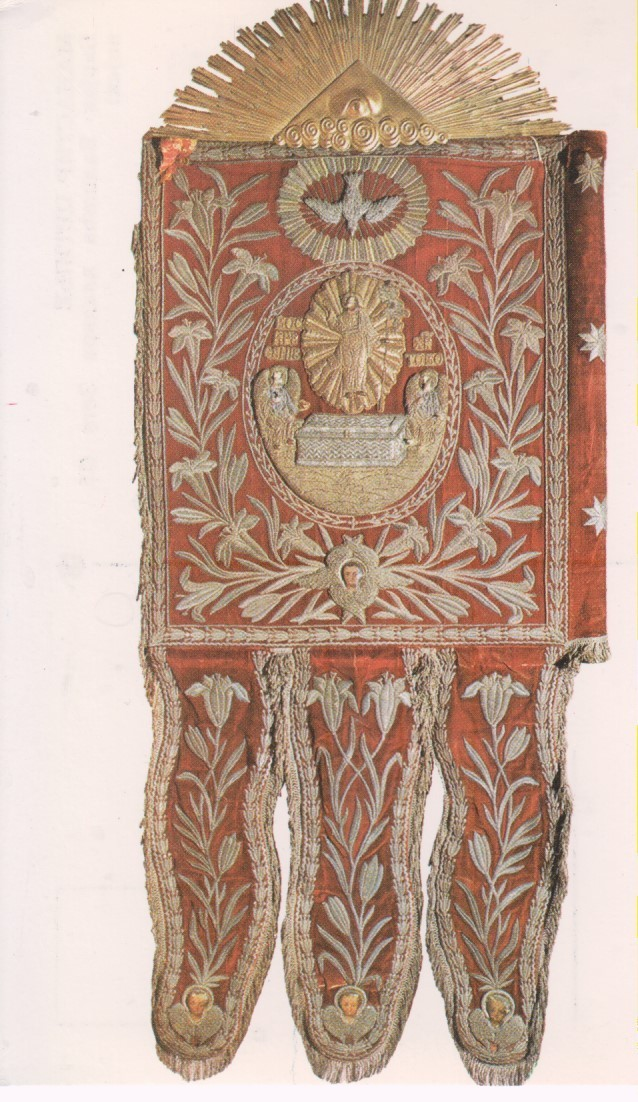
Banner of the Balšić family.

Konstantin was prevented from taking part in the administration of the Principality of Zeta, first because of his uncle Balša II and then later because of his cousin Đurađ II Balšić. Konstantin broke with his ruling cousin Đurađ II around 1390-1391 with the support of his mother Teodora and traveled to the Ottoman Court of Bayezid I, where he became an Ottoman Vassal. Konstantin also pursued multiple alliances to strengthen his position, forming alliances with people such as Vuk Branković, who was long standing rival of the Balšić family. Konstantin also married his sister Jevdokija Balšić to Esau de' Buondelmonti who was the Despot of Epirus.

Konstantin also had several influential family connections through his mother. His mother’s niece Helena Dragaš married the Byzantine emperor Manuel II Palaiologos. His half brother Mrkša Žarković from his mothers first marriage to Žarko had acquired the Principality of Vlorë through his marriage to Ruđina Balšić, granddaughter of Andrea II Muzaka and daughter of Balša II. Konstantin kept very close relations with his half brother and often resided at his court in Vlorë and even helped him secure recognition of his marriage from the Patriarch of Constantinople, which had previously been considered invalid due to the close kinship of the couple.

Konstantin appears to have aimed for control for the city of Shkodër following the Ottoman capture of the city. Some sources suggested that he may have held the city briefly but by the year of 1393 the town was under the administration of Sahin, the Ottoman commander. Konstantin may have clashed with the Ottomans because of this short rule of Shkodër, as sources indicated that he had temporarily fled to an Adriatic island, from which he was communicating with Venice.

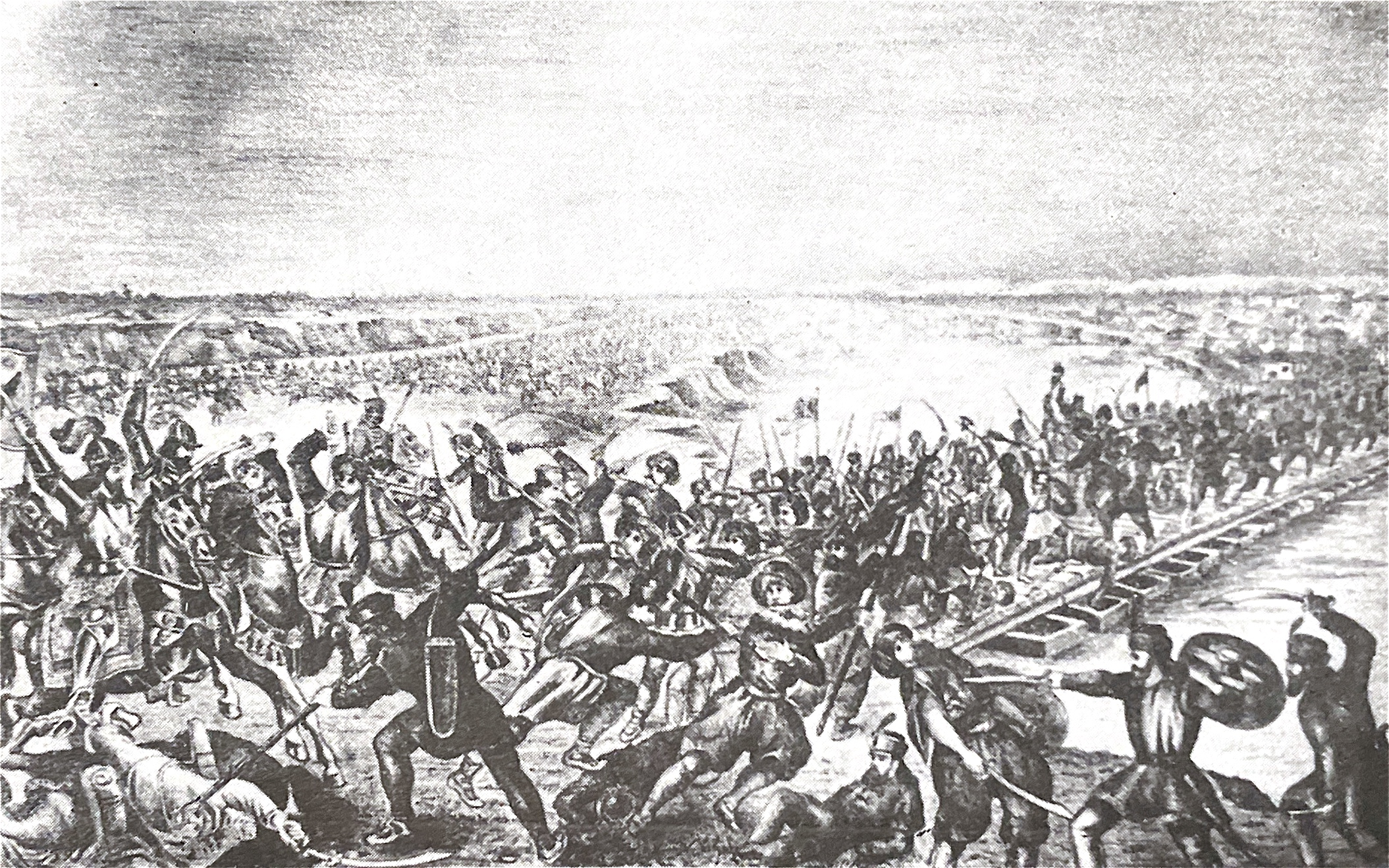
Painting of the Battle of Rovine.

After the Ottomans secured the city of Shkodër, they sought to extend their influence over the Northern Albanian lords in the region. They brought Dhimitër Jonima into negotiations, which then led to Ottoman discussions with Mark Barbadigo of Krujë, who was a Venetian Vassal and who had recently been in conflict with Venice. Facing the threat of Ottoman expansion, Barbadigo agreed to become an Ottoman vassal while keeping control of Krujë and his other territories extending all the way to Durrës. Mark Barbadigo no longer being a Venetian vassal he began to raid Venetian lands near Durrës, which then prompted Venice to dispatch Niketa Thopia, their governor of Durrës, who then defeated Barbadigo’s forces in battle. In response to Mark Barbadigo defeat the Ottomans in late 1394, appointed Konstantin as the new ruler of Krujë, replacing Mark Barbadigo who then proceeded into exile at the court of Konstantin's cousin Đurađ II Balšić. In 1395 Konstantin was called to fight alongside the Ottomans at the Battle of Rovine.

The Venetians attempted to persuade Konstantin to surrender Krujë to them but he had refused. Konstantin then married the Albanian Princess Helena Thopia who was the widow of Mark Barbadigo, who held the hereditary claims to Krujë. Helena was also Konstantin's first cousin, as Helena's mother, Voisava Balšić and Konstantin's father Đorđe I Balšić were brother and sister. Helena's maternal grandfather and Konstantin's paternal grandfather was Balša I. Konstantin mother who was now a nun had then joined Konstantin at his court in krujë and took an active role at his court. Konstantin had also acquired the town of Danjë, which also included a profitable customs post.

== Later life and death ==
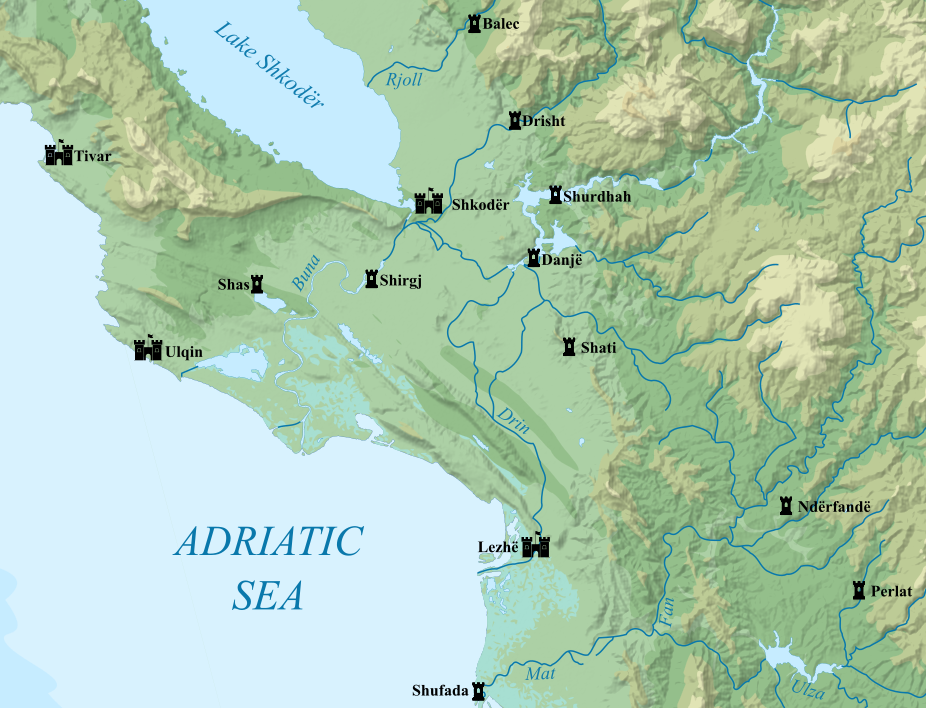
Map of Northern Albanian cities.

While the Ottomans were preoccupied elsewhere, Đurađ II Balšić seized the opportunity to recover his lost territories, which were under Ottoman control. In the year 1395, he took Shkodër, Drisht, Shirgj, as well as Danjë, which was held by Konstantin. Recognizing that he could not defend these gains against an Ottoman counterattack Đurađ II ceded Shkodër, Drisht, Shirgj and the other surrounding Lake Skadar region as well as the right bank of the Bojana River to the Republic of Venice. However Danjë, did not pass into Venetian control because by this time it had come under the control of the Albanian nobleman Koja Zaharia, who was an Ottoman vassal but had refused to relinquish the town to them.

On 8 August 1401 the Venetian authorities in Venice granted permission for Konstantin and his wife Helena Thopia to travel freely within the lands of the Republic of Venice. They were also assured that any property rightfully belonging to them would be restored upon proof of their claim. This decree allowed for Konstantin, Helena, their children, and their retainers to reside, travel, and conduct themselves safely and amicably within Venetian controlled lands and territories, with the same privileges as Venetian citizens.

Additionally, Helena Thopia requested that certain properties formerly belonging to her late brother Gjergj Thopia, Prince of Albania and currently held in Durrës be formally returned to her. Venice agreed to review and confirm her claims through investigation and legal procedures. Until her claims could be verified Venice instructed its officials to treat her and Konstantin and their household fairly and ensure that they could manage their affairs without any interference or harm to the interests of Venice.

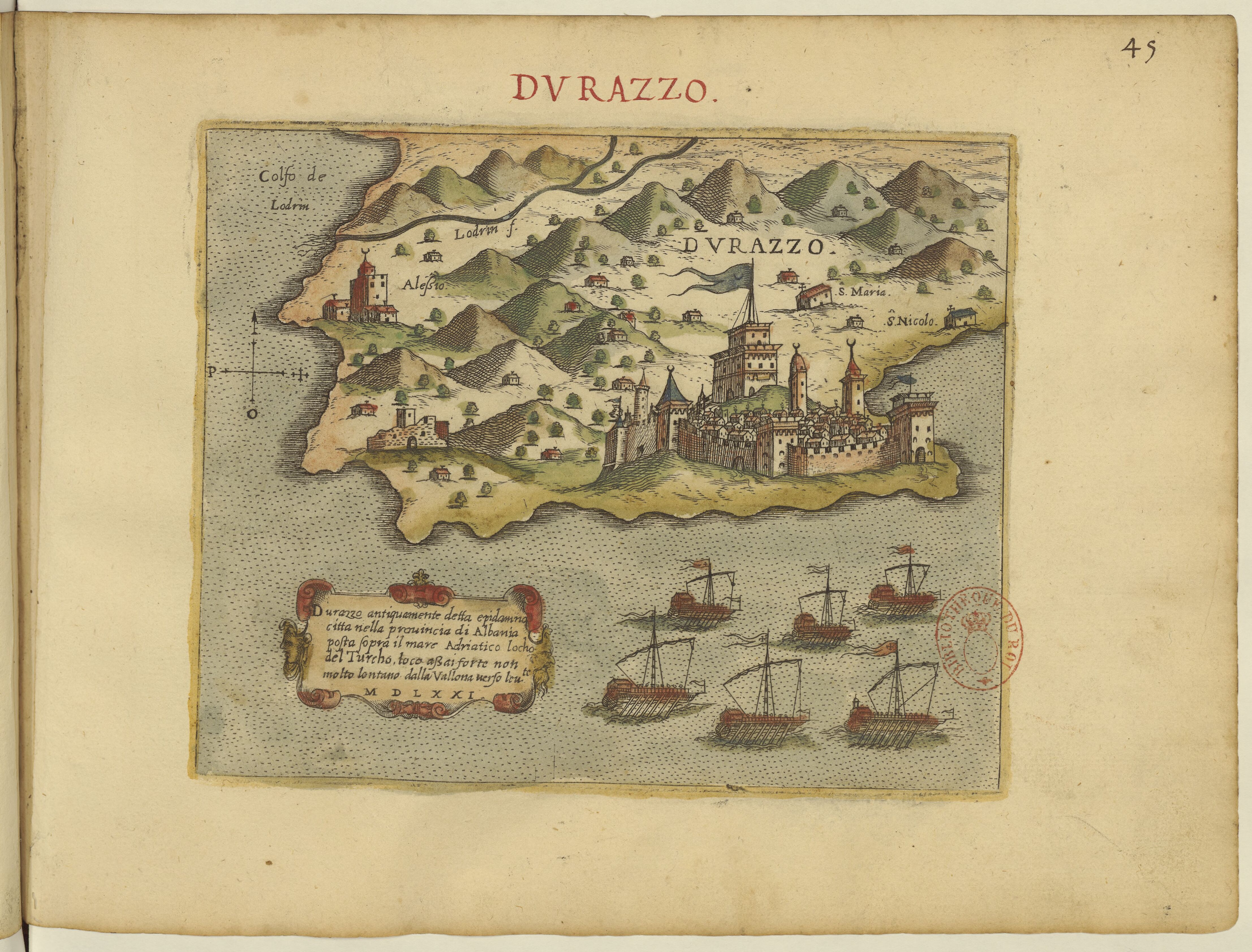
Durrës in 1571.

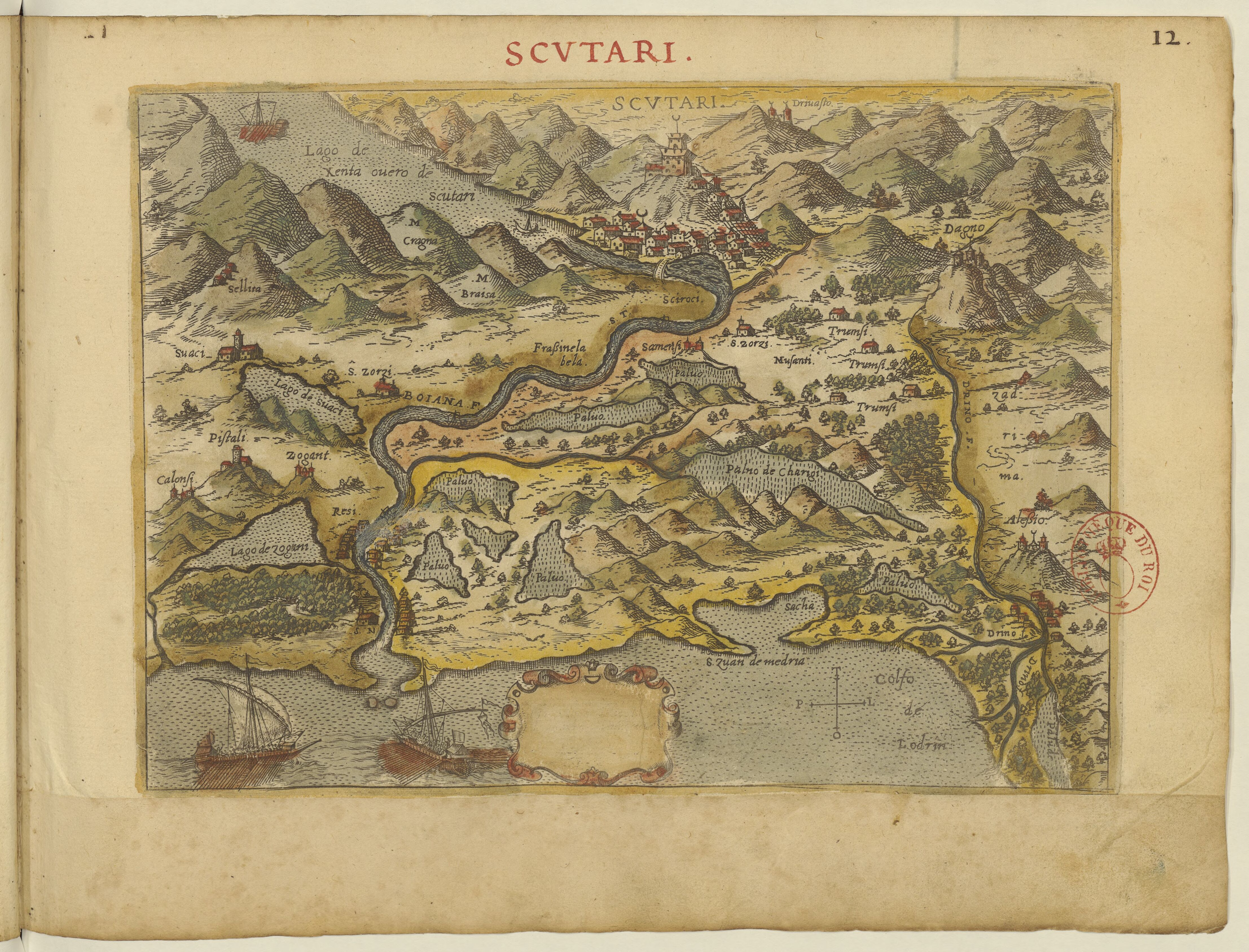
Shkodër in 1571.

By 1402 when many of the Albanian Ottoman vassals went to support Bayezid I at the Battle of Ankara Konstantin had remained in Albania. Taking advantage of this situation Konstantin launched an attack on Durrës, which was under Venetian control. The attack had failed and Konstantin was captured by Venetian forces. He was then captured, tried and executed by the Venetians on the scaffold in either the city of Durrës or Shkodër. Following his death, Krujë was taken by Niketa Thopia.

Konstantin’s widow, Helena Thopia and their son Stefan Maramonte went to Venice and later took refuge with Helena’s cousin Maria Thopia, who was married to Filip Maramonte. Stefan Balšić, was then often referred to as Stefan Maramonte by both the Ragusans and Venetians.

== Titles ==
Konstantin Balšić held several titles during his lifetime. He was the Lord of Krujë and Lord of Danjë as an Ottoman vassal as well as Lord of Shkodër. In 1401 Venetian documents also refer to him as Lord of Serbia. Some Venetian chronicles also record that he styled himself King of Albania (Re de Albania). Konstantin also declared himself King Konstantin and issued a single known type of coin to assert his claim. The reverse of his coin depicts him seated on a throne, wearing an open crown, holding an imperial turban topped with a cross in his left hand and a sceptre in his right, accompanied by the legend M. Rex. COSTTANTINVS or D. REX. COSTAND-TINUS. The obverse of the coin shows Saint Stephen the Protomartyr, holding a gospel in his left hand and a censer in his right, sometimes inscribed with S. STEFANVS – SKVTARENSI or S. SCVTARI.

== Family ==
Konstantin Balšić married Helena Thopia who was the daughter of Karl Thopia, Prince of Albania. The couple had one child:

1. Stefan Maramonte, was a Zetan nobleman who served as a close associate and vassal to Balša III, but later sought Ottoman support for his rule over Zeta.

== Ancestry ==
Ancestors of Konstantin Balšić

4. Balša I
2. Đurađ I Balšić
5. Unknown
1. Konstantin Balšić
6. Dejan
3. Teodora Dejanović
28. Stephen Uroš II Milutin of Serbia
14. Stephen Uroš III Dečanski of Serbia
29. Ana Terter
7. Teodora-Evdokija
30. John Palaiologos (Caesar)
15. Maria Palaiologina, Queen of Serbia
31. Irene Metochitissa

== See also ==
- Balšić family

== Notes ==
1. See Titles section.

== Bibliography ==
- Academia Scientiarum et Artium Slavorum Meridionalium (1874). Monumenta spectantia historiam Slavorum meridionalium [Monuments Relating to the History of the South Slavs] (in Latin). Hartmann.
- Anamali, Skënder Jens; Prifti, Kristaq (2002). Historia e popullit shqiptar në katër vëllime [History of the Albanian People in Four Volumes] (in Albanian). Botimet Toena. ISBN 978-9-9927-1622-9.
- Bešić, Zarija M. (1970). Историја Црне Горе. Књига друга [History of Montenegro. Book Two] (in Serbian). Editorial Board for the History of Montenegro.
- Elsie, Robert (2013). A Biographical Dictionary of Albanian History. Bloomsbury Academic. ISBN 978-1-7807-6431-3.
- Fine, John V. A. (1994). The Late Medieval Balkans: A Critical Survey from the Late Twelfth Century to the Ottoman Conquest. University of Michigan Press. ISBN 978-0-4720-8260-5.
- Meta, Albana (2023). The Middle Ages A Forerunner of a Well-Organized Monetary System (PDF). Bank of Albania. ISBN 978-9-9282-6276-9.
- Premović, Marijan; Temizer, Abidin; Stanković, Teodora (2024). Zeta Under the Balšić Dynasty and the Ottoman Empire (1385-1421) (PDF). Academia Română– Centrul de Studii Transilvane.
- Schmitt, Oliver Jens (2001). Das venezianische Albanien (1392-1479) [Venetian Albania (1392–1479)] (in German). Oldenbourg. ISBN 978-3-4865-6569-0.

| Preceded by Niketa Thopia | Lord of Krujë; 1394–1402 | Succeeded by Niketa Thopia |
