= Tanusio Thopia =

Tanush Thopia Tanush Topia
- Count of Mat

Count of Mat
- Reign: 1328–1338
- Predecessor: Sevasto Thopia
- Successor: Andrea I Thopia
- Died: 1359
- Issue: Dominic Thopia; Andrea I Thopia
- House: Thopia
- Father: Sevasto Thopia
- Mother: Unknown

Tanusio Thopia or Tanush Thopia (Albanian: Tanush Topia fl. 1329–38) was an Albanian count that served Princes of Taranto Philip I and Robert, and Dukes of Durazzo John and Charles. He had domains in Mat.

== Background ==
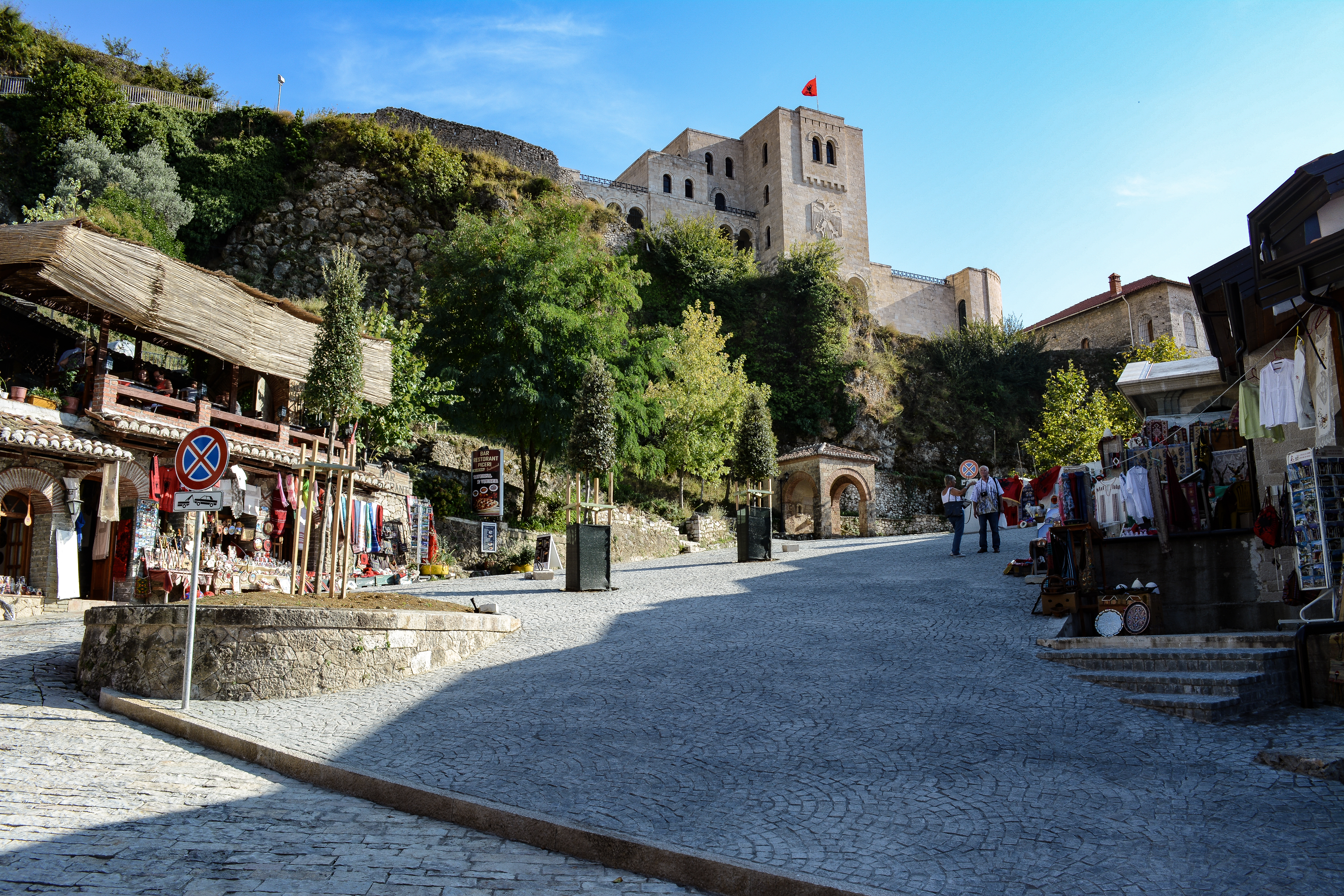
Castle of Krujë served as the Capital of the Thopia family

Under Philip I, the Kingdom of Albania was restricted to roughly the modern Durrës District. Upon the death of Philip I in 1332, there were various claims on his domains within the Angevin family. The rights of the Duchy of Durazzo (Durrës) and the Kingdom of Albania together were given to John of Gravina with a sum of 5,000 pounds of gold. After his death in 1336, his dominions in Albania passed to his son Charles, Duke of Durazzo. During this period there were different Albanian noble families who began consolidating their power and domains. One of them was the Thopia family whose domains were in central Albania. The Serbs were pressing hard in their direction and the Albanian nobles found a natural ally in the Angevins. Alliance with Albanian leaders was also crucial to the safety of the Kingdom of Albania, especially during the 1320s and 1330s. Most prominent among these leaders were the Thopias, ruling in an area between the rivers Mat and Shkumbin, and the Muzaka family in the territory between the rivers Shkumbin and Vlorë. They saw the Angevins as protectors of their domains and made alliances. During 1336–1337 Charles had various successes against Serb forces in central Albania.

== History ==
He was mentioned in 1329 as one of the counts of Albania. In an act of Robert, King of Naples, dated 15 April 1338, Tanusio was mentioned as Count of Matia (conte di Matia). This reconfirmed Thopia's relations to the Angevins from the time of Philip I. By 1343, Serbian King Stefan Dušan had conquered almost all of Albania, except for Durazzo which had been defended under the command of Tanusio.

== Issue ==
According to Karl Hopf, Tanusio's son or brother Andrea, as told by Gjon Muzaka (fl. 1510), had fallen in love with the daughter of Robert of Naples when her ship, en route to the Principality of the Morea to be wed with the bailli, had stopped at Durazzo where they met. Andrea abducted and married her, and they had two sons, Karl and George. King Robert, enraged, under the pretext of reconciliation had the couple invited to Naples where he had them executed. Karl Thopia later became the Prince of Albania.

== See also ==
- Thopia family
- Principality of Albania (medieval)
- Saint Gjon Vladimir's Church

== Sources ==
- Anamali, Skënder; Prifti, Kristaq (2002). Historia e popullit shqiptar në katër vëllime (in Albanian). Botimet Toena. ISBN 978-99927-1-622-9.
- Fine, John Van Antwerp (1994). The Late Medieval Balkans: A Critical Survey from the Late Twelfth Century to the Ottoman Conquest. University of Michigan Press. ISBN 978-0-472-08260-5.
- Nicol, Donald MacGillivray (2010). The Despotate of Epiros 1267–1479: A Contribution to the History of Greece in the Middle Ages. Cambridge University Press. ISBN 978-0-521-13089-9.
