= Principality of Albania (medieval) =

Former country

Principality of Albania Principata e Arbërisë (Albanian)
- 1359–1415
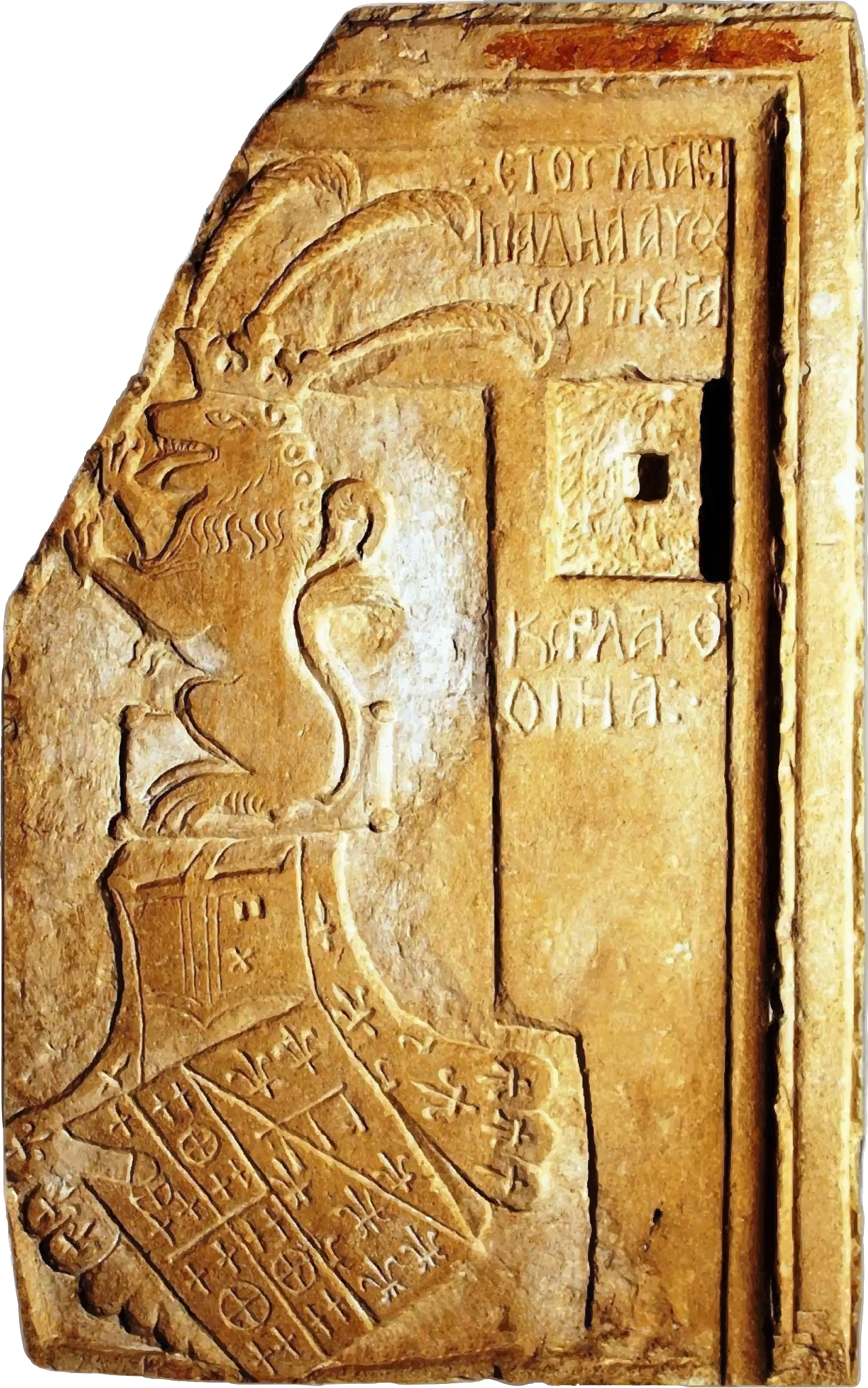
- Coat of Arms of Karl Thopia

- Maximum territorial extent of the medieval Principality of Albania (1359–1415)
- Status: Principality
- Capital: Durrës
- Common languages: Albanian
- Religion: Roman Catholicism; Eastern Orthodoxy
- Prince
  - 1359–1388: Karl Thopia
  - 1388–1392: Gjergj Thopia
  - 1388–1392: Helena Thopia; Marco Barbarigo (co-rulers)
  - 1392–1394: Niketa Thopia
  - 1394–1402: Helena Thopia; Kostandin Balsha (co-rulers)
  - 1402–1415: Niketa Thopia
- Historical era: Medieval
  - Established: 1359
  - Capture of Durrës by Karl Thopia: 1368
  - Ottoman conquest: 1415
- ISO 3166 code: AL
Preceded by	Succeeded by
Kingdom of Albania	Sanjak of Albania; Venetian Albania
- Today part of: Albania

The Principality of Albania (Albanian: Principata e Arbërisë) was an Albanian principality ruled by the Albanian dynasty of Thopia. The first notable ruler was Tanusio Thopia, who became Count of Mat in 1328. The principality would reach its zenith during the rule of Karl Thopia, who emerged in 1359 after the Battle of Achelous, conquering the cities of Durrës and Krujë and consolidating his rule of central Albania between the rivers of Mat and Shkumbin. The principality would last up until 1415, when it was conquered by the Ottoman Empire.

== History ==
=== Reign of Tanusio Thopia ===
The principality emerged with Tanusio Thopia, mentioned in 1329 as the count of Albania. In an act of Robert, King of Naples in 15 April 1338, Tanusio was mentioned as Count of Mat (conte di Matia), which reconfirmed Thopia's relations to the Angevins from the time of Philip I. By 1340 the Thopia controlled much of the territory between the rivers Mati and Shkumbin rivers. Together with the Muzaka family, they agreed to recognize Angevin suzerainty after rebelling against the Serbs. However except for Andrea Muzaka who defeated the Serbs in a battle in the Peristeri mountains, no action was taken to realize the treaty with the Angevins.

During 1342–1343, Stefan Dušan had conquered almost all of Albania, except for Durrës which remained under Angevin-Albanian rule, despite heavy Serbian pressure, marking thus the end of Byzantine rule over Albania. After Stefan Dušan's death in 1355 the Thopia family regained its domains and ruled most of central Albania.

=== Reign of Karl Thopia ===
Tanusio had one son, Andrea Thopia, who became the son-in-law of Robert, King of Naples without his consent. Robert had sent his daughter to get married in Morea, however during the journey she met Andrea in Durrës, and the couple got married and had two children, Gjergj and Karl Thopia. Robert, enraged, invited the couple to Naples in 1342 on the pretext of wanting to reconcile with them, where he had them both executed.

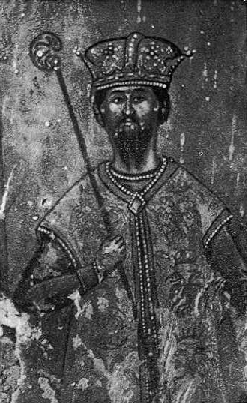
Karl Thopia, by Kostandin Shpataraku, Ardenica Monastery

The Thopias became prominent in the 1350s and 60s, expanding their holdings and subjugating local nobles and tribes. In 1359, Tanusio died and was succeeded by Karl Thopia.

Karl took part in the Battle of Achelous against Nikephoros II Orsini, the Despot of Epirus, where he led the Albanian tribes against the despotate. Orisni was killed during the battle by Karl and his army was destroyed, resulting in an Albanian victory. Thus, Epirus was left without a ruler and the vacuum was filled by Gjin Bue Shpata and Pjetër Losha, who would establish the Despotate of Angelokastron and Lepanto and the Despotate of Arta south of the domains of the principality.

Since 1362, Karl sought to capture Durrës, which was in the possession of the Duchess Johanna of Anjou. The first, certainly still unsuccessful siege lasted from April 1362 until May 1363. Then, Karl had to withdraw his troops, who were weakened by an epidemic disease. By 1363, he had captured territories around Durrës, as well as Krujë, which would serve as his headquarters. Karl was ultimately able to conquer Durrës in March 1368. This was the last hold of the Angevins in Albania, thus putting an end to the medieval Kingdom of Albania. Karl forged close ties with Venice and gained their support, who recognized him as Prince of Albania.

Around 1370, Karl attacked the dominions of the Muzaka family to their south and managed to capture from them the territory between Shkumbin and Seman, marking the maximum extent of the territory held by the principate.

Balša II made a fourth attempt to conquer Durrës, which had become an important commercial and strategic center. In 1382, Balša II began a war and seized Durrës. In 1385, the defeated Karl Thopia, appealed to Murad I for support against his rivals, the Balsha noble family of the Principality of Zeta. This was the equivalent of inviting the Ottoman Empire into Albania in order to help him defeat his rivals in Zeta.

This attempt caused an Ottoman force, led by Hayreddin Pasha, to quickly march into Albania along the Via Egnatia. The Ottoman force routed the enemy by inflicting heavy defeats on Balša II's forces. Balša II himself was killed in a big battle on Saurian Field near Lushnje (Battle of Savra) in 1385, ending the Balsha family's rule over Durrës.

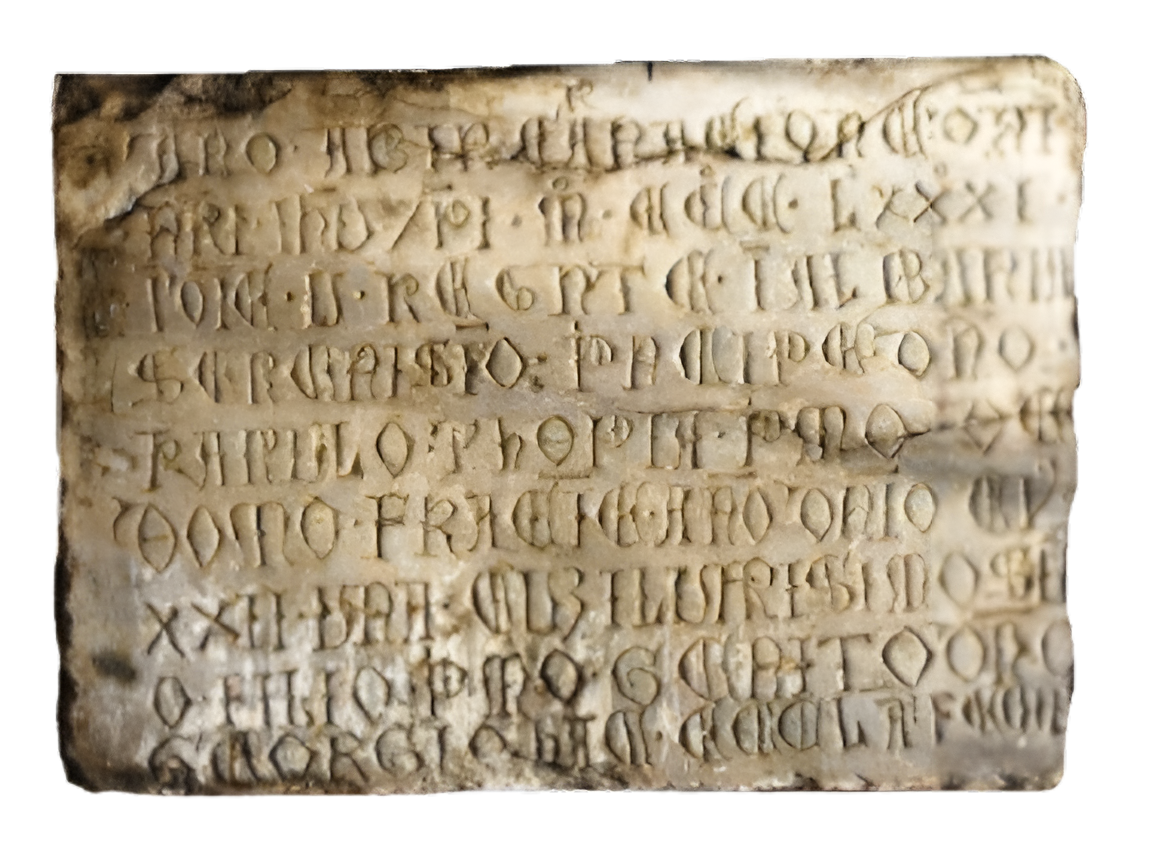
Carved marble slab found on the southern side of St. Jovan Vladimir's Church in Elbasan. The inscription, written in Latin with fraktur letters, commemorates the church's construction in 1381 under Prince Karl Thopia, with his son, Lord Gjergj, during the 22nd year of his reign.

=== Reign of Gjergj Thopia ===
After Karls death in 1388, he was succeeded by his ill son, Gjergj Thopia. Due to the growing power of the Ottomans, the pressure from the Balsha noble family in the north and Gjergj's illness, Thopia rule was on the verge of collapse. Thus, Venice was concerned about Durrës falling into the hands of the Ottomans and made immediate plans to take it over through diplomatic means. By securing Durrës, Venice could keep a watchful eye on the Adriatic, secure the transit of galleys and safely benefit from Durrës' salt. In the summer of 1392, Gjergj surrendered Durrës and in return requested assistance in acquiring other lands and castles, securing the safe return of Albanians from Ottoman occupied territories and financial aid. Gjergj died in September 1392.

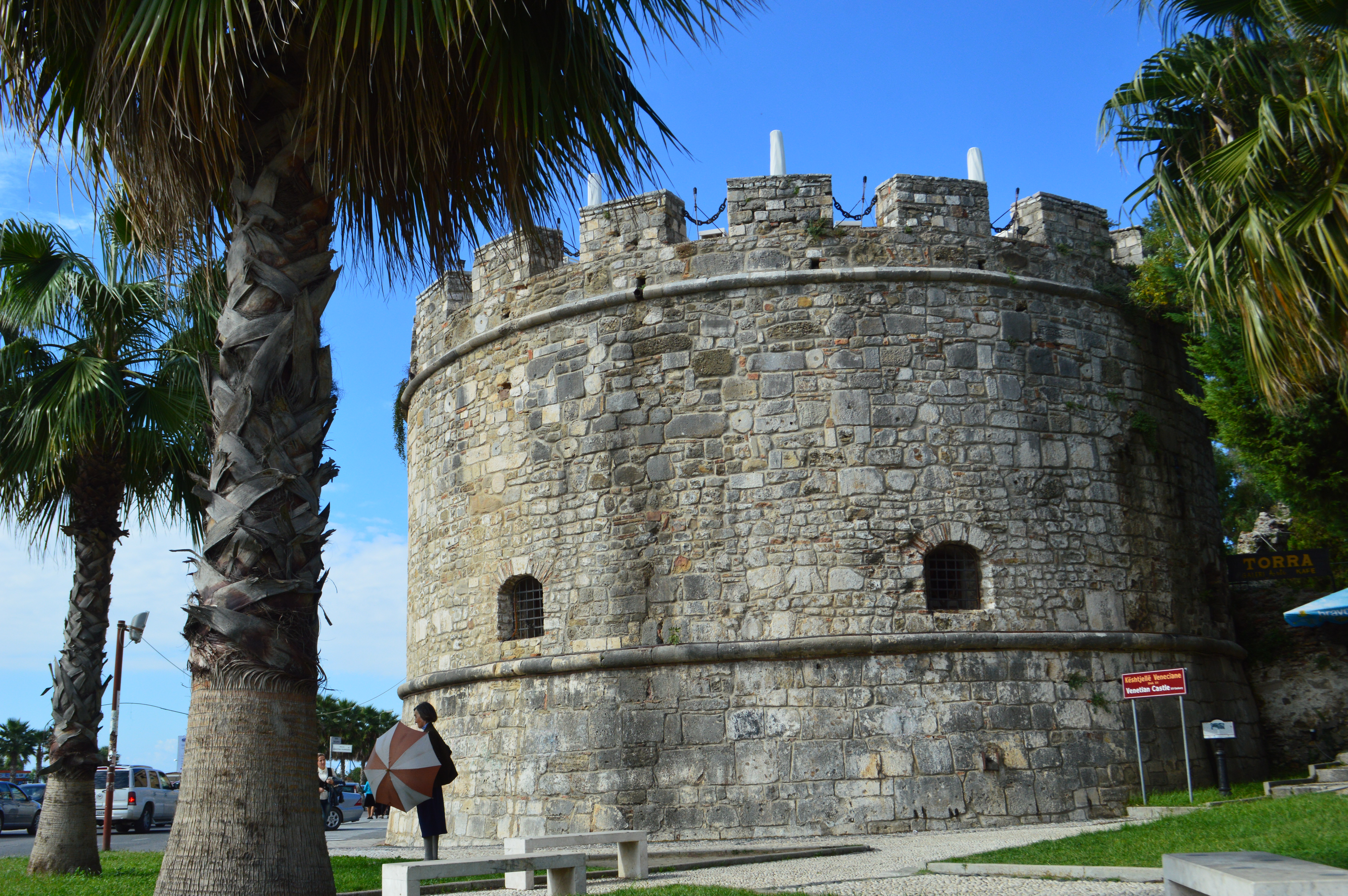
The Venetians after 1392 improved the fortifications of Durrës Castle, reinforcing it with several guard towers.

=== Later Decades ===
With the exception of Durrës, the majority of the principality went to his sister, Helena Thopia. Helena was married to a Venetian nobleman, Marco Barbarigo, who resided in Krujë and was the de facto ruler of the possessions of Thopia. Marco ruled for a period of time under Venetian suzerainty. The Ottomans had set to increase their influence over Albanian lands. Presumably due to Ottoman threat of attack, Marco switched loyalty to the Ottomans and began to raid Venetian lands around Durrës. As a result, Niketa Thopia, a son of Karl and the governor of Durrës under the Venetians, attacked Barbarigo with their support and defeated him badly, forcing Barbarigo to seek refuge in the court of Gjergj Strez Balsha. It was Kostandin Balsha, a relative, who would rule Krujë, starting from late 1394. He soon married Helena and inherited her hereditary rights to Krujë.

After the Battle of Ankara and subsequently the death of Bayezid I, many Albanian lords recognized Venetian suzerainty instead of Ottoman, such Koja Zaharia, Dhimitër Jonima and various members of the Dukagjin family. Konstantin Balsha, under the vassalage of the Ottomans, attempted to take Durrës in 1402, where he failed and was killed. Following his death, Niketa quickly retook Krujë on his own behalf, and the Venetians recognized him by 1404 as governor of Krujë and regarded him as an ally rather than a deputy of Venice. By 1410, Niketa ruled the territory between Krujë and the Shkumbin river and served under Venetian vassalage. In late 1411, Niketa was captured by Theodor Corona Musachi after a skirmish and was retained as a prisoner. He was released in July 1413 and returned to Krujë, where would continue to rule until 1415 when Albania fell under the Ottoman Empire and was incorporated into the Sanjak of Albania.

== Rulers ==
Picture	^{Title}Name	Reign	Notes
	^{Count of Mat} Tanusio Thopia	1328–1338	Tanusio was recognized as count of Matia.
	^{Count of Mat} Andrea I Thopia	1338–1343	Son of Tanusio Thopia and Father of Karl Thopia.
	^{Princeps Albanese} Karl Thopia	1359–1388	Karl ruled most of modern central Albania from 1359 to 1388 and claimed the title of Princeps Albaniae. Karl seized Durrës in 1368 from the Angevins. In 1374, Pope Gregory XI awarded him the title "Grande Conte d'Albania" (Great Count of Albania). Karl lost Durrës in 1376, conquered by Louis, Duke of Durazzo, but recovered it in 1383 when the last mercenaries of the Navarrese Company moved to Greece. Thopia ruled over the regions of Durrës, Kruja, Peqin, Elbasan, Mokra and Gora, that is, along both sides of the Via Egnatia as far east as Lake Ohrid.
	^{Princeps Albanese} Gjergj Thopia	1388–1392	Son of Karl Thopia. He succeeded his father after his death. In 1392 he was required to return Durazzo to the Republic of Venice. In 1392 and died later that year without issue.
	^{Lady of Krujë} Helena Thopia	1388–1392	Eldest daughter of Karl Thopia. She was married to Marco Barbarigo. She inherited Krujë and the surrounding region after her father's death and ruled with her husband. In 1392 her brother Niketa attacked the city and forced them to find refuge with the Balsha noble family. Married Kostandin Balsha in 1394 and regained Krujë. After her husband died in 1402 her brother Niketa recaptured the castle from her.
	^{Lord of Krujë} Niketa Thopia	1392–1394	He ruled for 2 years until losing Krujë.
	^{Lady of Krujë} Helena Thopia	1394–1403	Married Kostandin Balsha in 1394 and ruled Krujë with her husband. After Kostandin Balsha's death in 1402 Helena's brother Niketa recaptured the castle from her.
	^{Lord of Krujë} Niketa Thopia	1403–1415	In 1403, Niketa Thopia managed to capture the city of Krujë from his sister, Helena Thopia, thus uniting the principality previously held by another member of the Thopia family. Upon his death in 1415, the castle of Krujë fell into Ottoman hands.

== See also ==
- Thopia family
- Saint Gjon Vladimir's Church
- Duke of Durazzo
- Albanian principalities
- History of Albania
- Medieval Albanian coinage

== Sources ==
- Albanian Academy of Science. History of Albanian People. ISBN 99927-1-623-1
- Stefanaq Pollo Histoire de l'Albanie des origines à nos jours. Roanne: Horvath. 1974. ISBN 2-7171-0025-3
- Tajar Zavalani: Histori e Shqipnis. Tiranë: Phoenix. 1998. ISBN 99927-607-0-2
- Georges Castellan: Histoire de l’Albanie et des Albanais. Crozon: Armeline. 2002. ISBN 2-910878-20-1
- Fine, John Van Antwerp (1994), The Late Medieval Balkans: A Critical Survey from the Late Twelfth Century to the Ottoman Conquest, University of Michigan Press, ISBN 978-0-472-08260-5
- Gruber, Johann Gottfried (1867), Allgemeine Encyklopädie der Wissenschaften und Künste in alphabetischer Folge, Gleditsch
- Soulis, George Christos (1984), The Serbs and Byzantium During the Reign of Tsar Stephen Dušan (1331-1355) and His Successors, Dumbarton Oaks Library and Collection
- Ducellier, Alan (1987), La façade maritime de la principauté des Kastriote, de la fin du XIVe siècle à la mort de Skanderbeg
- Zečević, Nada (2015), The Tocco of the Greek Realm, Central European University Press, ISBN 9788691944100
- Sainty, Guy Stair (2018), The Constantinian Order of Saint George: and the Angeli, Farnese and Bourbon families which governed it, Boletín Oficial del Estado, ISBN 978-84-340-2506-6
- Anamali, Skënder (2002), Historia e popullit shqiptar në katër vëllime, Toena, ISBN 99927-1-622-3
- Molina, Grabiela Rojas (2022), Decoding Debate in the Venetian Senate: Short Stories of Crisis and Response on Albania (1392-1402), Brill, ISBN 978-9004520936
