= Marco Barbarigo di Croia =

Venetian nobleman

Marco Barbarigo
- Venetian "count" or "captain" Governor of Krujë (Venetian); Governor of Krujë (Ottoman); Governor of Cattaro (Venetian)
- Born: Republic of Venice
- Died: 1428; Republic of Venice
- Noble family: Barbarigo
- Spouse: Helena Thopia (1380s–94)
- Occupation: 1388–93: Venetian subject 1393–94: Ottoman subject 1422–28: Venetian subject

Marco Barbarigo (fl. 1388–d. 1428) was a Venetian nobleman, who married Helena Thopia and thus inherited the rule of Krujë (in modern Albania), which he initially held under Venetian and later, after quarrelling with Venetian noblemen, Ottoman suzerainty, until in late 1394 when he was defeated by Venetian subject Niketa Thopia (his wife's half-brother) and forced into exile at the court of Đurađ II Balšić. He was appointed the Venetian governor (as "count" or "captain") of Cattaro (Kotor) in ca. 1422.

== Life ==
Barbarigo was a Venetian businessman. He married Helena Thopia, the daughter of Albanian magnate Karl Topia, who had ruled as "Prince of Albania" from Durazzo and had since 1386 served as a Venetian vassal. After Karl's death in 1388, Barbarigo inherited the castle of Krujë and the surrounding region through his wife. He ruled from the strong fortress of Krujë and held the possessions under Venetian suzerainty.

After the Ottomans had occupied Scutari (by early 1393), they defeated Demetrius Jonima, who then set up a meeting between Barbarigo and the Ottomans. As Barbarigo had recently quarrelled with the Venetians, and likely felt an Ottoman threat, he accepted Ottoman suzerainty. He had a meeting with Beyazid. He retained Krujë and his lands which stretched to Durazzo, and began to plunder Venetian holdings in the vicinity of Durazzo. Venice ordered Niketa Thopia, the governor of Durazzo, to answer the plundering; Thopia heavily defeated Barbarigo. The Ottomans, presumably disappointed, installed their vassal Konstantin Balšić as governor of Krujë; Barbarigo was exiled, taking refuge at the court of Đurađ II Balšić, who at the time was also an Ottoman subject. Konstantin soon married Barbarigo's wife Helena, who had the hereditary rights to Krujë. In chronicles, Helena is said to have been unfaithful, transferring Krujë to her lover, Konstantin. Đurađ II had declined an offer of 1,000 ducats to give up Barbarigo to the Venetians. Afterwards, Đurađ II broke ties with the Ottomans and seized rival Konstantin's stronghold Dagno in 1395, with Venetian assistance.

In 1400, Barbarigo attacked Venetian merchant Phillip Barelli on the Cape of Rodon, and wed his wife, after which there is no more mention of Barelli in history.

Around 1422, he was appointed overseer of Cattaro (Kotor). He succeeded Antonio Boccole. Stefan Lazarević, the ruler of the Serbian Despotate, had been ceded Zeta from his nephew Balša III (Đurađ II's successor) in April 1421, but the Venetians did not recognize him, holding on to the occupied Zetan coast (including the Bay of Kotor) and Bojana, including Drivast recaptured by them after Balša's death. The Venetians had no intention to cede Balša's former possessions to Despot Stefan and even requested Ottoman support in case of an attack. The Second Scutari War followed, which ended inconclusive in August 1423 with the Treaty of Sveti Srdj; in it, Kotor accepted Venetian suzerainty.

He was succeeded as governor of Cattaro by Stefano Querini, who held office until 1425. Marco Barbarigo died in 1428.

== Annotations ==
1. His name in Serbo-Croatian historiography has been spelled "Marko Barbadigo" (Serbian Cyrillic: Марко Барбадиго).

Titles of nobility
Preceded by Karl Topia as Prince of Albania	Governor of Krujë (Venetian suzerainty); 1388–93	Ottoman suzerainty
Venetian suzerainty	Governor of Krujë (Ottoman suzerainty); 1393–94	Succeeded by Konstantin Balšić
Preceded by Antonio Boccole	Governor of Cattaro (Venetian suzerainty); 1422–23	Succeeded by Stefano Querini
