= Boglia Zaharia =

Medieval Albanian Princess of the Zaharia family

Boglia Zaharia Bolja Zahariajt
- Princess Consort of Zeta

Princess Consort of Zeta
- Tenure: 1412–1421
- Predecessor: Mara Thopia
- Spouse: Balsha III (m. 1412; died 1421)
- Issue: Unnamed Son; Teodora Balsha
- House: Zaharia
- Father: Koja Zaharia
- Mother: Bosa Dukagjini
- Religion: Catholic

Boglia Zaharia (Albanian: Bolja Zahariajt), also known as Bolia, Bolja Zakaria or Boya Zaharia was an Albanian Princess and member of the Zaharia family.

== Life ==
Boglia Zaharia was the daughter of Koja Zaharia, an Albanian nobleman, and Bosa Dukagjini, a member of the prominent Dukagjini family. Her father held the titles of Lord of Shati and Danjë. Details about her early life remain scarce.

Boglia Zaharia became the second wife of Balsha III, the Lord of Zeta. The couple married around late 1412 or early 1413, following Balsha's divorce from his first wife, Mara, daughter of Niketa Thopia. With Boglia, Balsha had two children: a son who died in infancy and a daughter Teodora Balsha. Balsha also had a daughter, Jelena Balsha, from his first marriage to Mara.

After Balsha III fell ill and then eventually died in April 1421 the Republic of Venice captured Drisht, Ulcinj, and most likely Bar, while local families like the Đurašević seized lands in Upper Zeta and the Gulf of Kotor. Boglia unable to defend her late husband’s territories decided to return to her family in Danjë.

== Family ==
Boglia Zaharia married Balsha III. The couple had two children:

1. Unnamed Son, was born in 1415 but died shortly after birth.
2. Teodora Balsha, married Petar Vojsalić Hrvatinić who was a Duke of Bosnia.

== See also ==
- Zaharia family

== Bibliography ==
- Božić, Ivan (1979). Nemirno pomorje XV veka [The Restless Seacoast of the 15th Century] (in Serbian). Srpska književna zadruga.
- Djukanovic, Bojka (2023). Historical Dictionary of Montenegro. Rowman & Littlefield Publishers. ISBN 978-1-5381-3915-8.
- Fine, John V. A. (1994). The Late Medieval Balkans: A Critical Survey from the Late Twelfth Century to the Ottoman Conquest. University of Michigan Press. ISBN 978-0-4720-8260-5.
- Instituti Albanologjik i Prishtinës (1968). Gjurmime albanologjike [Albanological traces] (in Albanian). Instituti Albanologjik i Prishtinës.
- Ostrogorsky, George (1951). Pronija : prilog istoriji feudalizma u Vizantiji i u južnoslovenskim zemljama [Pronia: a contribution to the history of feudalism in Byzantium and the South Slavic countries] (in Serbian). Beograd: Naučna knjiga.
- Šufflay, Milan von (1925). Srbi i Arbanasi : njihova simbioza u srednjem vijeku [Serbs and Albanians: their symbiosis in the Middle Ages] (in Serbian). Seminar za arbansku filologiju.
- Vrankić, Petar (2025). Family, Political and Spiritual Profile of Queen Katarina Kosača-Kotromanić in the Historical Context of Her Time. University of Augsburg.
