= Gojčin Crnojević =

Lord of Zeta, Serbian noble

- Lord of Zeta
- Coat of arms
- Reign: 1435–1451
- Predecessor: Đurađ Đurašević
- Successor: Stefan I Crnojević
- Other titles: knez; vojvoda
- Died: after 1451
- Noble family: Crnojević
- Issue: Aleksandar
- Father: Đurađ Đurašević
- Mother: Busha Zaharia
- Occupation: Serbian vassal; Venetian vassal

Gojčin Crnojević (Serbian Cyrillic: Гојчин Црнојевић, 1398–d. after 1451), also known as Kojčin Crnojević or Koja Crnojević, was a Lord of Zeta, initially as a vassal of the Serbian Despotate until he revolted against Despot Stefan Lazarević. He disappeared from sources in 1451.

Gojčin was the second son of Đurađ Đurašević of the Crnojević noble family. His mother Busha Zaharia was the daughter of the Albanian nobleman Koja Zaharia of the Zaharia family, and he was named after his grandfather. His father and uncle Aleksa were the lords of the territory of Paštrovići (Luštica and hills above Kotor and Budva) during the reign of Balša III (r. 1403–1421). His brothers were Đurašin, Stefanica and another one with an unknown name and historical role. He was mentioned for the first time in 1431. He initially had the title of knez, and later vojvoda. In the beginning, he was the leading character among the brothers. The Crnojevići, initially vassals of the Serbian Despotate, revolted against the Despot; Gojčin was particularly participating. He held good relations with the Republic of Ragusa and became its citizen in July 1444. He and his two younger brothers defected to Venice after their older brother concluded his alliance with Stjepan Vukčić Kosača. He had a son, Aleksandar ("Aleksa" or "Leka").

== Family tree ==
Ancestry of Gojčin Crnojević

8. Crnoje Đurašević
4. Radič Crnojević
9. Unknown
2. Đurađ Đurašević
10. Unknown
5. Jelena
11. Unknown
1. Gojčin Crnojević
12. Nikollë Zaharia
6. Koja Zaharia
13. Unknown
3. Busha Zaharia
14. Lekë I Dukagjini
7. Bosa Dukagjini
15. Unknown

== Annotations ==
- His given name is also spelled Kojčin (Којчин). In Latin: Goycinus.

== Sources ==
- Božić, Ivan (1979). Nemirno pomorje XV veka [The Restless Sea of the 15th Century] (in Serbian). Srpska književna zadruga.
- Fine, John Van Antwerp (1994). The Late Medieval Balkans: A Critical Survey from the Late Twelfth Century to the Ottoman Conquest. University of Michigan Press. ISBN 978-0-472-08260-5.
- Bešić, Zarij M. (1970). Istorija Crne Gore / 2. Crna gora u doba oblasnih gospodara (in Serbian). Titograd: Redakcija za istoiju Crne Gore. OCLC 175122851.

Gojčin Crnojević Crnojević family Born: 1398 Died: 1451
Political offices
Preceded by Đurađ Đurašević	Lord of Zeta; 1435–1451	Succeeded by Stefan I
