= Bosa Dukagjini =

15th century Albanian noblewoman who became Lady of Shati and Danjë

Bosa Dukagjini Bozha Dukagjini
- Lady of Shati and Danjë
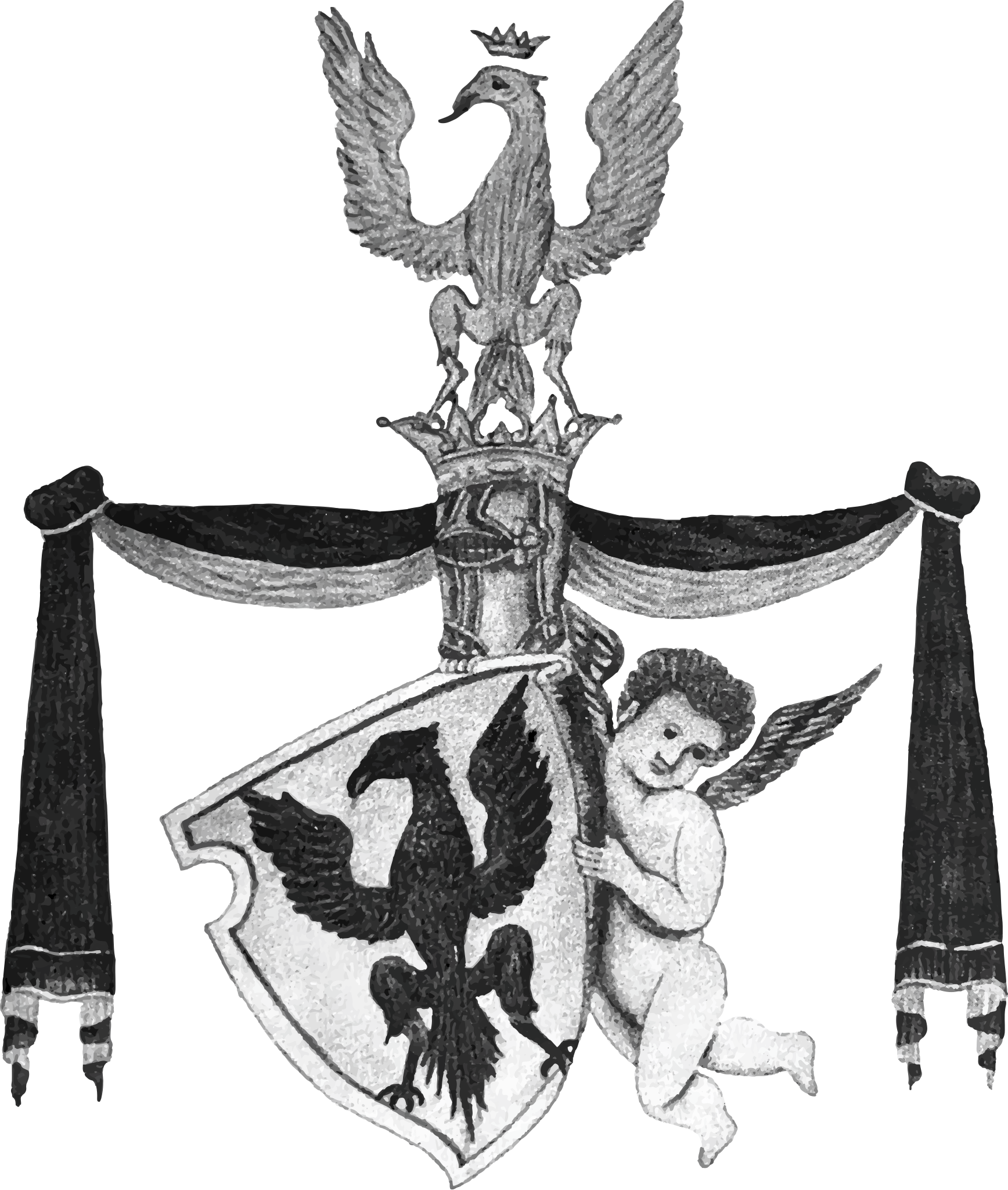
- Coat of Arms of the Dukagjini Family

Lady of Shati and Danjë
- Consort: ????-1445
- Successor: Title abolished (Relinquished to Venice)
- Born: Unknown
- Died: September 1448; Shkodër, Venetian Albania
- Noble family: Dukagjini family
- Spouse: Koja Zaharia
- Issue: Lekë Zaharia; Boglia Zaharia; Busha Zaharia
- Father: Lekë I Dukagjini
- Mother: Unknown

Bosa Dukagjini (Albanian: Bozha Dukagjini) also known as Boza, Bosa, Boksa or Boxia was a 15th century Albanian noblewoman from the House of Dukagjini. She became Lady of Shati and Danjë through her marriage to Koja Zaharia who was the lord of Shati and Danjë. After the death of Koja the Zaharia estates passed onto their son Lekë Zaharia; following his death in 1444 Bosa then inherited the Zaharia holdings and then later transferred them to Venetian authority. She died in 1448 during the great fire in Shkodër.

== Life and marriage ==
Bosa Dukagjini, born in the late 14th century into the noble House of Dukagjini, a prominent Albanian family. She was the daughter of Lekë I Dukagjini (the Elder), a notable northern Albanian nobleman, while her mother's identity is unknown. Not much is known about her early life.

Bosa married Koja Zaharia, the lord of Shati and Danjë, at an unknown date in the either the late 14th or early 15th century. Through this marriage she became the lady of Shati and Danjë.

In 1430 during the Ottoman campaign in Albania led by Ishak Bey following the fall of Thessaloniki, Ottoman forces captured Danjë and expelled Koja Zaharia from the fortress. Despite the loss of Danjë the Zaharia family still retained control of Shati and maintained influence in the region.

Koja Zaharia faded from the historical record after 1442 with no specific date of death recorded and his son Lekë Zaharia inherited his domains.

The Zaharia family regained control of Danjë when the sultan after a brief period of control officially restored the town to Lekë Zaharia.

== Later life and death ==
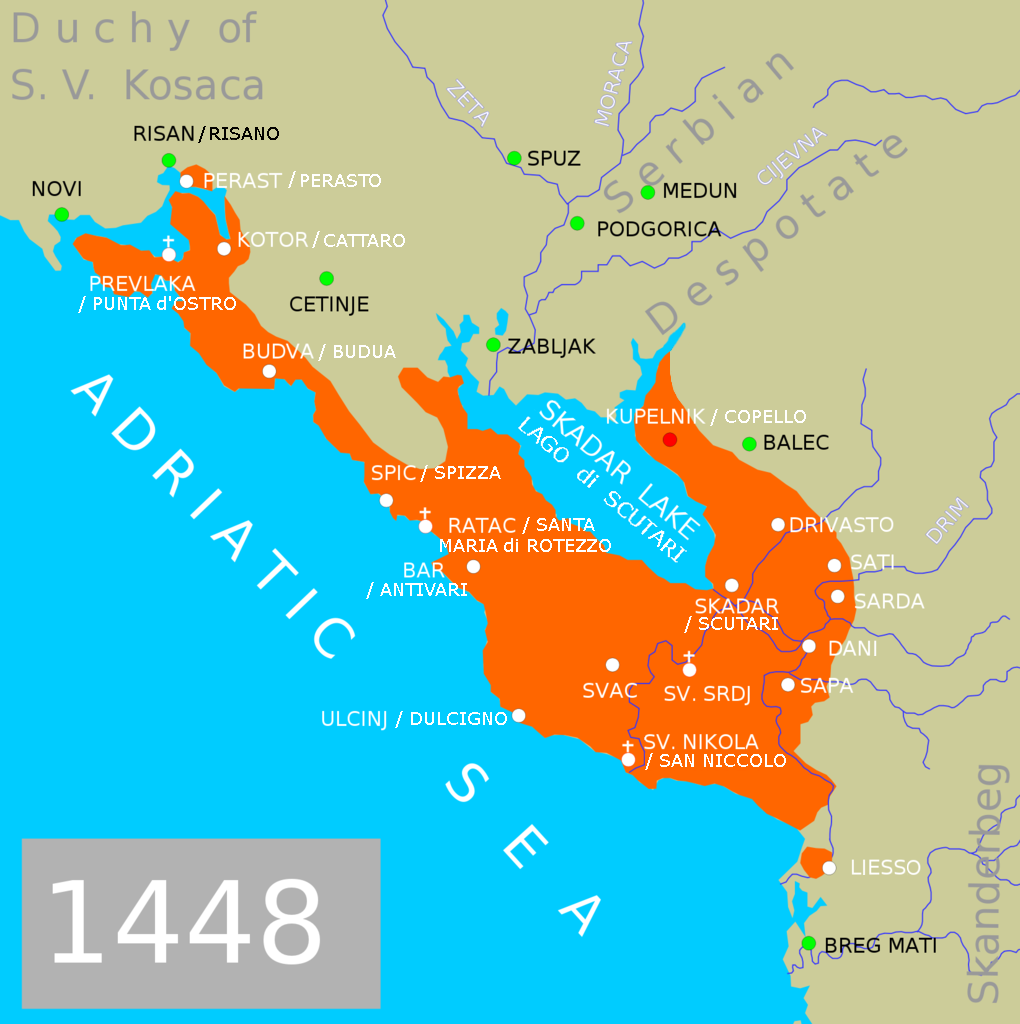
Venetian possessions in Northern Albania (1448)

After the murder of her son Lekë Zaharia in 1444 by Nicholas Dukagjini the domains of the Zaharia passed onto Bosa. Venice then rapidly tried to secure Danjë and other Zaharia towns in their domain including Shati, Gladri, and Dushmani. Bosa transferred control of Danjë and its other surrounding territories to the Venice in Shkodër, under the administration of Francesco Quirini. This decision was supported by the local population as well who preferred Venetian rule over that of the Albanian League of Lezhë. Skanderbeg and his allies demanded the return of these towns to the League of Lezhë but Venice refused. In 1447 Skanderbeg laid siege to Danjë in the Albanian–Venetian War while Venice responded by offering rewards for his assassination and seeking Ottoman support. In 1448 Skanderbeg's forces defeated a Venetian army on the Drin River leaving Venice with control only over fortified garrisons. Despite the conflict, Venice retained the disputed towns. Later that year at the peace conference held in Lezhë on 4 October 1448 it was agreed on that Venice would keep Danjë and the other contested towns, but in return the Republic was obliged to grant Skanderbeg an annual pension of 1,400 ducats.

Bosa moved to Shkodër herself, where she received a yearly income from the Danjë estates as compensation. Documents from 1444 to 1445 indicate that of her children, only her daughter Boglia Zaharia survived, while her grandson Koja Crnojević, son of another daughter Busha Zaharia, had already passed away. Bosa spent her final years in Shkodër and died in 1448 during a major fire that devastated the city.

== Family ==
Bosa Dukagjini married Koja Zaharia. The couple had three children:

- Lekë Zaharia, Lord of Shati and Danjë, may have been betrothed to Irene Dushmani
- Boglia Zaharia, Princess Consort of Zeta, married Balsha III. She had 2 children: Unnamed Son died shortly after birth and Teodora Balsha
- Busha Zaharia, married Đurađ Đurašević. She had 4 children: Đurašin Đurašević, Gojčin Crnojević, Stefan Crnojević and Unknown Son

== See also ==
- Dukagjini family
- Zaharia family

== Bibliography ==
- Božić, Ivan (1979). Nemirno pomorje XV veka [The Restless Sea of the 15th Century] (in Serbian). Srpska književna zadruga.
- Ćirković, Sima; Božić, Ivan; Bogdanović, Dimitrije; Đurić, Vojislav (1970). Istorija Crne Gore [History of Montenegro] (in Serbian).
- Djukanovic, Bojka (2023). Historical Dictionary of Montenegro. Rowman & Littlefield Publishers. ISBN 978-1-5381-3915-8.
- Fine, John V. A. (1994). The Late Medieval Balkans: A Critical Survey from the Late Twelfth Century to the Ottoman Conquest. University of Michigan Press. ISBN 978-0-4720-8260-5.
- Hopf, Karl (1873). Chroniques greco-romanes inedites ou peu connues [Unpublished or little-known Greco-Roman chronicles] (in French). Weidmann.
- Noli, Fan Stylian (1947). George Castrioti Scanderbeg (1405-1468). International Universities Press.
- Schmitt, Oliver Jens (2001). Das venezianische Albanien (1392-1479) [Venetian Albania (1392-1479)] (in German). Oldenbourg. ISBN 978-3-4865-6569-0.
- Vrankić, Petar (2025). Family, Political and Spiritual Profile of Queen Katarina Kosača-Kotromanić in the Historical Context of Her Time. University of Augsburg.
