= Đurađ Đurašević =

Đurađ Đurašević Crnojević
- voivode
- Coat of arms
- Born: mid-14th century
- Died: after 1435
- Buried: Kom Monastery
- Noble family: Crnojević
- Spouse: Busha Zaharia
- Issue: Gojčin, Đurašin, Stefan
- Father: Radič Crnojević
- Mother: Jelena

Đurađ Đurašević Crnojević (Serbian Cyrillic: Ђурађ Ђурашевић Црнојевић; fl. 1413–1435) was the lord of Paštrovići (a coastal tribe) of the Lordship of Zeta and a voivode of the Serbian Despotate, alongside his younger brother Aleksa (Lješ). Đurađ Đurašević was a member of the House of Crnojević.

== Biography ==
Đurađ and his brother Aleksa (Lješ) were lords of the territory of Paštrovići (Luštica and hills above Kotor and Budva) during the reign of Balša III. The Đurašević family was a branch of the Kalođurđević family. Its members held the most distinct positions in the court of Balša III. Đurađ was the head of the family. Đurađ was one of the witnesses listed in the charter issued by Balša III when he founded a church of the Praskvica Monastery in 1413. Đurađ's son and Aleksa Paštrović, an envoy of Sandalj Hranić, were also present. Đurašević was elected as a witness and maybe the executor of the charter of Balša III because at that time he ruled over Paštrovići, Luštica and the hills above Kotor and Budva.

After the death of Balša III they refused Venetian invitations to switch sides and to accept Venetian suzerainty remaining loyal to the new lord of Zeta, Serbian Despot Stefan Lazarević. They controlled 10 salt ponds in Grbalj valley near Kotor. Đurađ and his brother Aleksa built the Kom Monastery in the period between 1415 and 1427, when Upper Zeta was held by the Crnojevići.

On 10 March 1420 Venetians promised to appoint Đurađ and his brother Aleksa (Lješ) as governors of Budva.

== Personal life ==
He married Busha Zaharia the daughter of Albanian nobleman Koja Zaharia of the Zaharia family. He had four sons: Đurašin Đurašević, Gojčin Crnojević, Stefan (Stefanica) Crnojević and fourth son with unknown name and historical role.

Ancestors of Đurađ Đurašević

16. kefalija Ilija
8. Đuraš Ilijić
4. Crnoje Đurašević
2. Radič Crnojević
1. Đurađ Đurašević
3. Jelena

== Sources ==
- Fine, John Van Antwerp (1994). The Late Medieval Balkans: A Critical Survey from the Late Twelfth Century to the Ottoman Conquest. University of Michigan Press. ISBN 978-0-472-08260-5.
- Bešić, Zarij M. (1970). Istorija Crne Gore / 2. Crna gora u doba oblasnih gospodara (in Serbian). Titograd: Redakcija za istoiju Crne Gore. OCLC 175122851.
