= First Scutari War =

1405–1412 war between Zeta and Venice

First Scutari War Lufta e Parë e Shkodrës
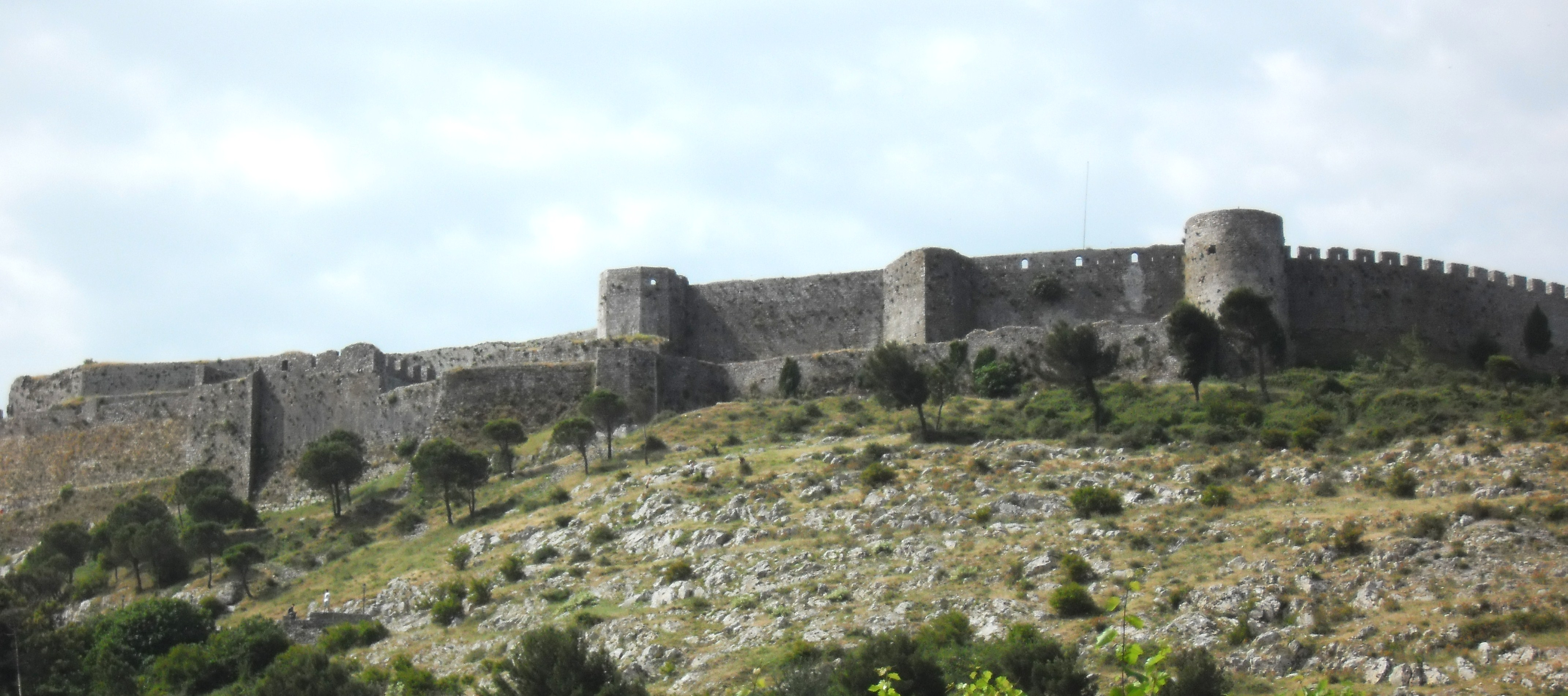
- Shkodër Castle
Date	Early 1405 – 30 January 1413
Location	Shkodër and Coast of the Lordship of Zeta
Result	Inconclusive, see aftermath

Belligerents
Zeta	Republic of Venice

Commanders and leaders
Balsha III; Jelena Lazarević; Đurašević family; Radič Humoj; Nika Bogoje; Petar Konte; Nikola Lumbardini; Andrija Sklavo; Nikola Sigeci	Fantin Marcello; Koja Zaharia; Dhimiter Jonima

The First Scutari War (Albanian: Lufta e Parë e Shkodrës; Serbo-Croatian: Први скадарски рат) was an armed conflict in 1405–1412 between Zeta and the Venetian Republic over Shkodër and other former possessions of Zeta captured by Venice.

== Background ==
Before this war, Zeta was governed by Đurađ II Balšić. His wife Jelena Lazarević was firmly opposed to his pro-Venetian policy and to his sales of Shkodër, Drisht, and other towns together with islands on Shkodër Lake to the Venetians in 1396. She did not approve Venetian obstruction of contacts between local Eastern Orthodox Christians with the Metropolitanate of Zeta and the Serbian Patriarchate of Peć, and also the fact that Venetians were cutting off Eastern Orthodox monasteries around Skadar Lake from their legally valid income and possessions. In addition to that, an aggressive trading policy of Venetians in the region significantly reduced Zeta′s earnings. She had significant influence on the way her son Balsha III governed Zeta after the death of Đurađ II. Even before the First Shkodër War she was in dispute with Venetians about the jurisdiction of Zetan Orthodox Metropolitanate over the orthodox churches around the river Bojana and the Church of St. Peter in Shkodër. In front of Venetians Balsha III, based on Jelena's instructions, protected the ancient rights of the Serbian church and Zetan Metropolitan bishop appointed by the Patriarchate of Peć.

== Balsha's supporters ==
After Đurađ II died in 1403, Balsha III took over control of Zeta and with Jelena′s support started an eight years long war against Venice in 1405. Jelena and Balsha apparently started the war without much preparations hoping they would soon easily receive international support. They especially counted on support of the Serbian Despot and Dubrovnik, the supporters of emperor Sigismund who had territorial aspirations in Dalmatia. These hopes were not justified. In January and again in March 1405 they first approached Dubrovnik for help, but were politely rejected.

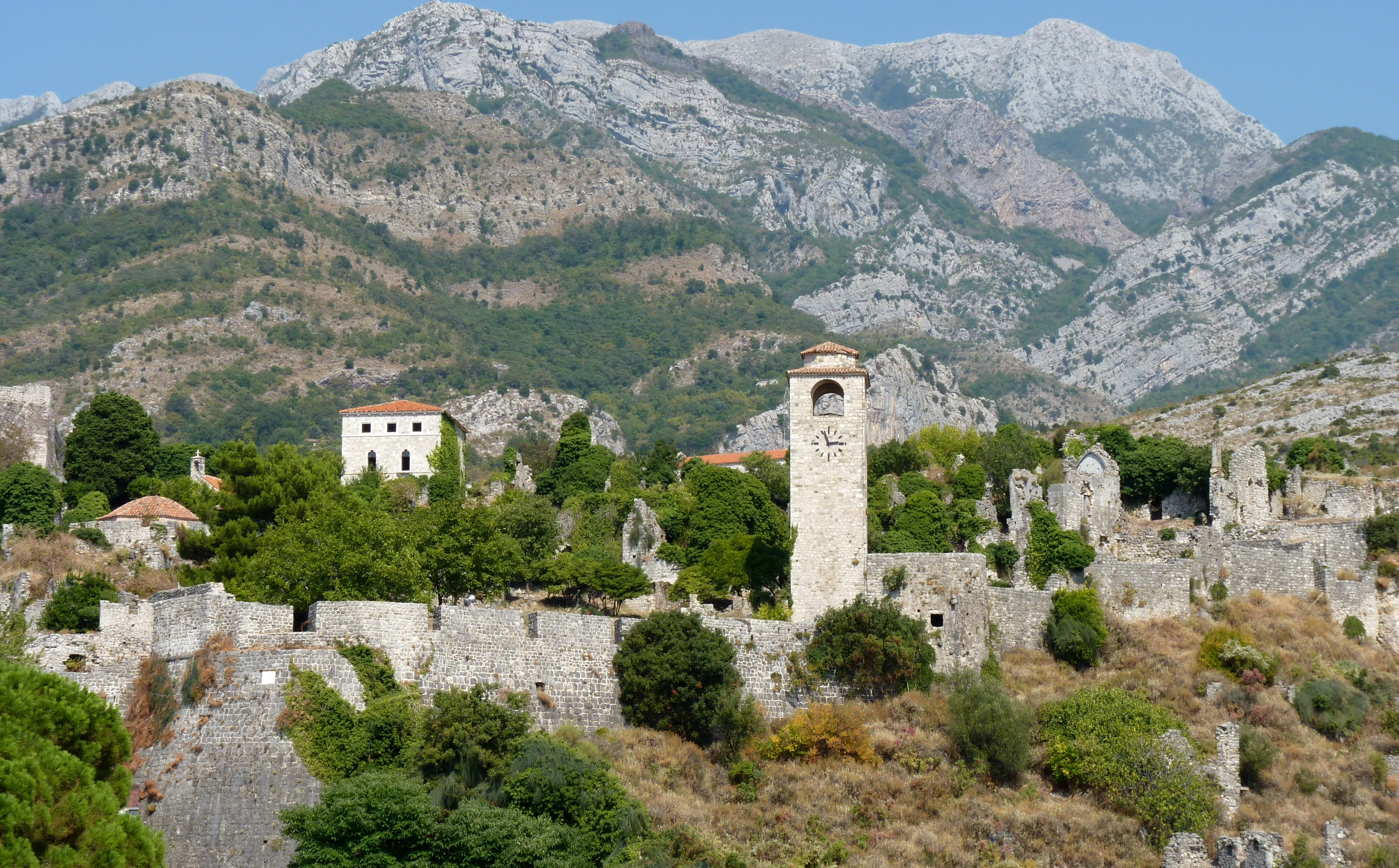
Walls of Bar

During this war, Balsha was not fully supported by urban population of Bar and Ulcinj whose business interests were somewhat better preserved with good relations with powerful the Venetian Empire. His main supporters were warrior nobility in Zeta, pronoiers in the Shkodër region, and Serb and Albanian peasants unsatisfied with taxes. The Đurašević family participated on Balsha's side, Koja Zaharia and Dhimiter Jonima supported Venetians, while Dukagjinis were neutral.

== Beginning of the war ==
The war began in 1405 when Balsha took advantage of the rebellion of local population in the region of Shkodër and captured all Shkodër region (including Drivast) except the Shkodër Castle itself. It is uncertain if he inspired the revolt which started in early 1405, but he certainly utilized it. Radič Humoj and many other most distincted local Venetian pronoiers (like Nika Bogoje, Petar Konte, Nikola Lumbardini, Andrija Sklavo, and Nikola Sigeci) deserted Venice and supported Balsha III in order to save their position and property. Balsha was intolerant of local nobles who would not support him and many of those who would dare to desert him were captured and crippled, i.e. deprived of a limb and nose.

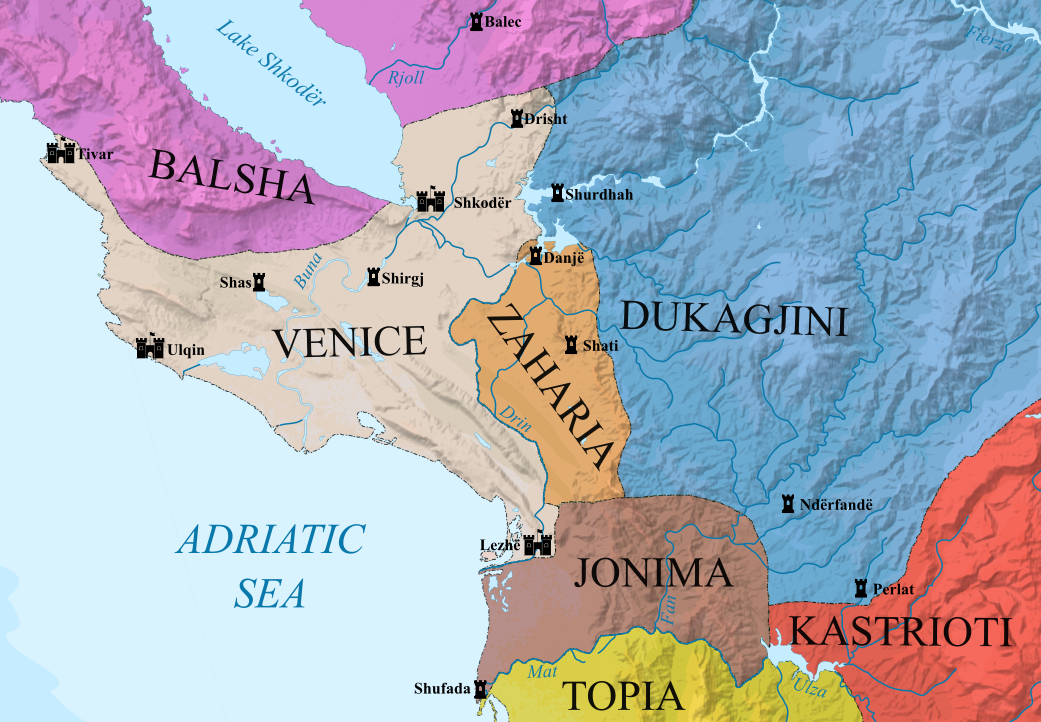
Recreated map of northern Albania c. 1406, a year into the First Scutari War.

Venetians in return captured the three most important ports of Zeta: Bar, Ulcinj, and Budva. They also offered 500 ducats for the person who would kill Jelena Balsha and her son Balsha III. The reward was later increased to 2,000 ducats. Balsha found himself in a difficult situation because the Ottoman Empire (a possible ally against Venice) was weakened after the Battle of Ankara in 1402, and his ally the Serbian Despot was involved in the Ottoman civil war. To make things even worse, Sandalj Hranić intended to capture the whole Gulf of Kotor. In such circumstances Balsha decided to accept Ottoman suzerainty, which included a regular tribute payment to the sultan. In early 1407 Balsha married Mara, a daughter of Niketa Thopia who had good relations with the Republic of Venice and since then became a mediator during the war. In 1407 representatives of the Venetian Republic and Balsha III met on the territory in possession of Ratac in an attempt to negotiate peace. During negotiations held in June 1408, the Venetians insisted to keep Ratac in their possession. Still, peace negotiations were not successful.

== Peace treaty of 1409 ==
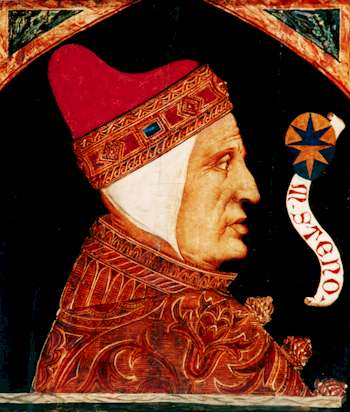
Michele Steno, a Doge of Venice met Jelena during peace negotiations

In 1409 Jelena decided to go to Venice to personally negotiate a peace. At the end of May she arrived in Dubrovnik but had to wait for almost two months because her hosts warned her on the presence of the Neapolitan galleys in Adriatic Sea. While she was waiting in Dubrovnik on 9 July 1409 Venice purchased the Dalmatian coast from Ladislaus of Naples for 100,000 ducats. This made Jelena's negotiating position very difficult. At the end of July she finally arrived in Venice. Because of the long voyage she was financially broken so the Venetians had to support her with three ducats a day during negotiations which lasted for three months. On 26 October 1409 a year-long peace agreement was signed without territorial changes for any of the parties. Jelena traveled back to Zeta through Dubrovnik where she received 100 ducats worth of presents. Although both her and Michele Steno, a Doge of Venice, swore on the Gospel to respect the peace agreement, there was no peace in reality.

== Continuation of the war ==
Venetians directly broke the peace agreement they signed with Jelena when they refused to pay agreed provisions to Balsha who in return attacked their possessions in early 1410. His fleet captured the whole Skadar Lake and forced Venetian fustas to retreat. In mid 1410 there was another rebellion in Shkodër. After this rebellion Balsha III besieged Shkodër and plundered its surrounding.

When Niketa Thopia was defeated and captured by Teodor III Muzaka at the end of 1411 Balsha divorced Mara because her imprisoned father was of no use to him anymore. At the end of 1412 or beginning of 1413 he married Bolja Zaharia, a daughter of Koja Zaharia who already married his other daughter to one of Đuraševići. Members of Đurašević family held the most distincted positions on the court of Balsha III. To bring Koja even more close Balsha appointed him as castellan of Budva.

== Aftermath ==
Both parties were unsatisfied with the peace treaty and believed that the other party was in breach of the agreed terms and that the other party should pay more for the damage during the war. It seems that Venice continued to jeopardize the rights of the Orthodox Church in the region of Skadar Lake. In such circumstances even a small conflict like a minor dispute between Hoti and Mataguži (two clans who lived north of the Skadar Lake, on the border of Zeta and Venetian Shkodër) over pasture lands started chain of events which led to the new war. Although Balsha III judged in favour of the Mataguži clan, Hoti attacked them and captured the disputed lands. Mataguži killed four Hoti clansmen during the counter-attack. Hoti complained to Balsha, who rejected their complaints with the words "You've got what you deserve!" (Serbian: Што сте нашли на туђој граници — то вам!). Two of disappointed Hoti's chieftains who led a minor part of the clan decided to leave Balsha and requested to be accepted under the Venetian suzerainty. At first Balsha himself advised the Venetian governor in Shkodër to accept them because he wanted to divide them from the rest of Hoti tribesmen. When he became aware of their eventual influence on the rest of Hoti tribesmen who remained loyal to him he changed his mind and insisted that Paolo Quirin should reject their request. In November 1414 the Senate instructed Paolo Quirin to ignore Balsha′s advice and to grant Venetian citizenship to Hoti renegades. In response, Balsha purchased weapons for his forces which in early spring 1415 attacked and burned village Kalderon near Shkodër. Based on Senate's instructions Venetians bribed the leader of the major group of Hoti (Andrija Hot) to accept Venetian suzerainty. By accepting Balsha's refugees, Venetians violated their previous agreements with Balsha who then decided not to respect their agreements anymore. He began to collect taxes on Venetian goods, confiscate Venetian grain, rob Venetian ships on Bojana and to prepare a military campaign against Hoti who organized a preventive attack against him at the beginning of 1418. In October 1418 Venetians started to confiscate goods owned by merchants from Ulcinj to compensate Venetians traders. In autumn 1418 Balsha decided to start a new war. He employed a Venetian garrison of about 50 mercenaries who guarded the Shkodër castle before they switched sides and went to Balsha. Balsha also arrested all Venetian citizens who were caught on the territory of Zeta. In March 1419 he started a new war—the Second Scutari War.

== See also ==
- Second Scutari War
- House of Balsha
- Republic of Venice

== Sources ==
- Bešić, Zarij M. (1970), Istorija Crne Gore / 2. Crna gora u doba oblasnih gospodara (in Serbian), Titograd: Redakcija za istoiju Crne Gore, OCLC 175122851
- Bogdanović, Dimitrije (1970), Gorički zbornik (PDF) (in Serbian), Cetinje: Metropolitanate of Montenegro and the Littoral, archived from the original (PDF) on 16 April 2015
- Fine, John Van Antwerp (December 1975), The Bosnian Church: a new interpretation : a study of the Bosnian Church and its place in state and society from the 13th to the 15th centuries, East European quarterly, ISBN 978-0-914710-03-5
- Srejović, Dragoslav; Gavrilović, Slavko; Ćirković, Sima M. (1982), Istorija srpskog naroda: knj. Od najstarijih vremena do Maričke bitke (1371), Srpska književna zadruga
- Tomin, Svetlana (September 2000), Otpisanije bogoljubno Jelene Balšić: Prilog shvatanju autorskog načela u srednjevekovnoj književnosti (PDF) (in Serbian), Cetinje: International scientific symposium "Nikon of Jeruzalem: time — personality — work"
- Fine, John Van Antwerp (1994), The Late Medieval Balkans: A Critical Survey from the Late Twelfth Century to the Ottoman Conquest, University of Michigan Press, ISBN 978-0-472-08260-5
- Ćirković, Sima (2004), Srbi među evropskim narodima [Serbs among European nations] (in Serbian), Belgrade: Equilibrium, ISBN 9788682937043, OCLC 62567039
- Spremić, Momčilo (2004), Jovan Ćulibrk (ed.), Crkvene prilike u Zeti u doba Nikona Jerusalimca (in Serbian), Cetinje, Belgrade: Svetigora, Publikum, pp. 73–108, archived from the original on 11 December 2013
