= Jelena Balšić =

Member of the Balšić noble family (1411–1453)

Jelena Balšić Jelena Balsha

Grand Duchess of Bosnia
- Tenure: 1435–1453
- Born: 1411
- Died: 1453 (aged 41–42)
- Noble family: Balšić
- Spouse: Stjepan Vukčić Kosača (m. 1424)
- Issue: Catherine of Bosnia; Vladislav Hercegović; Vlatko Hercegović; Hersekzade Ahmed Pasha
- Father: Balša III
- Mother: Mara Thopia

Jelena Balšić (Serbian Cyrillic: Јелена Балшић; 1411 – 1453) was a member of the Balšić noble family who married the Bosnian nobleman Stjepan Vukčić Kosača. She was the daughter of Balša III and Mara Thopia.

== Life ==
Jelena was born in 1411 as the daughter of Balša III of Zeta and Mara Thopia of Albania. She was named after her grandmother Jelena. Jelena's lineage is traced back to the Balšić and Thopia noble families. In 1424, at the age of 13, Jelena married Stjepan Vukčić Kosača, a significant political figure of the time. The union between Jelena and Stjepan Vukčić played a crucial role in shaping the political landscape of the region. Jelena was not only a wife and mother but also a central figure in the complex power dynamics of the time. Through her marriage to Stjepan Vukčić, she became the mother of several notable children, each leaving a mark on the history of the Balkans. Jelena died in 1453.

== Issue ==
- Catherine of Bosnia (1424–1478), in 1446 she married King Tomaš of Bosnia, and leaving Bosnian Church converted to Catholicism;
- Vladislav Hercegović (c. 1427–1489), Grand Duke of Bosnia, Lord of Krajina, married Kyra Ana, daughter of Georgios Kantakuzenos in 1455;
- Vlatko Hercegović (c. 1428–1489), Herceg of St. Sava, married an Apulian noblewoman;
- Hersekzade Ahmed Pasha (c. 1430–1515), baptized Stjepan; the youngest son of Stjepan Vukčić, whom Sultan Mehmed II took to his court, became a Muslim in the Sultan's service. He became the Grand Vizier and Grand Admiral to the Sultan, married Sultan Bayezid II's daughter, Fatima, in 1482; and had descendants by her.

== Family tree ==
Ancestry of Jelena Balšić

8. Karl Thopia
4. Niketa Thopia
9. Unknown
2. Mara Thopia
10. Maurizio Bua Sgouros
5. Unknown
11. Unknown
1. Jelena Balšić
12. Stracimir Balšić
6. Đurađ II Balšić
13. Milica Mrnjavčević
3. Balša III
14. Lazar of Serbia
7. Jelena Lazarević
15. Princess Milica of Serbia

== Sources ==
- Ćirković, Sima (1964). Историја средњовековне босанске државе [History of the medieval Bosnian state] (in Serbian). Srpska književna zadruga. OCLC 494551997.
- Nakaš, Lejla (2011), Konkordancijski rječnik ćirilskih povelja srednjovjekovne Bosne [Concordance Dictionary of Cyrillic Charters of Medieval Bosnia] (in Bosnian) (Posebna izdanja, knjiga X, svezak 1 ed.), Društvo za proučavanje srednjovjekovne bosanske historije, OCLC 1166792149
- Regan, Krešimir (2010), Bosanska kraljica Katarina (in Serbo-Croatian), Breza, ISBN 978-9537036553
- Spremić, Momčilo (2004), Jovan Ćulibrk (ed.), Crkvene prilike u Zeti u doba Nikona Jerusalimca (in Serbian), Cetinje, Belgrade: Svetigora, Publikum, pp. 73–108, archived from the original on 11 December 2013
- Vrankić, Petar (5 October 2017). "Stjepan/Ahmedpaša Hercegović (1456.?-1517.) u svjetlu dubrovačkih, talijanskih i osmanskih izvora". Hercegovina: Časopis za kulturno i povijesno naslijeđe (in Croatian) (3): 9–67. doi:10.47960/2712-1844.2017.3.9. ISSN 2566-3429.
