= Mara Thopia =

Albanian Princess

Mara Thopia Mara Topia
- Princess Consort of Zeta
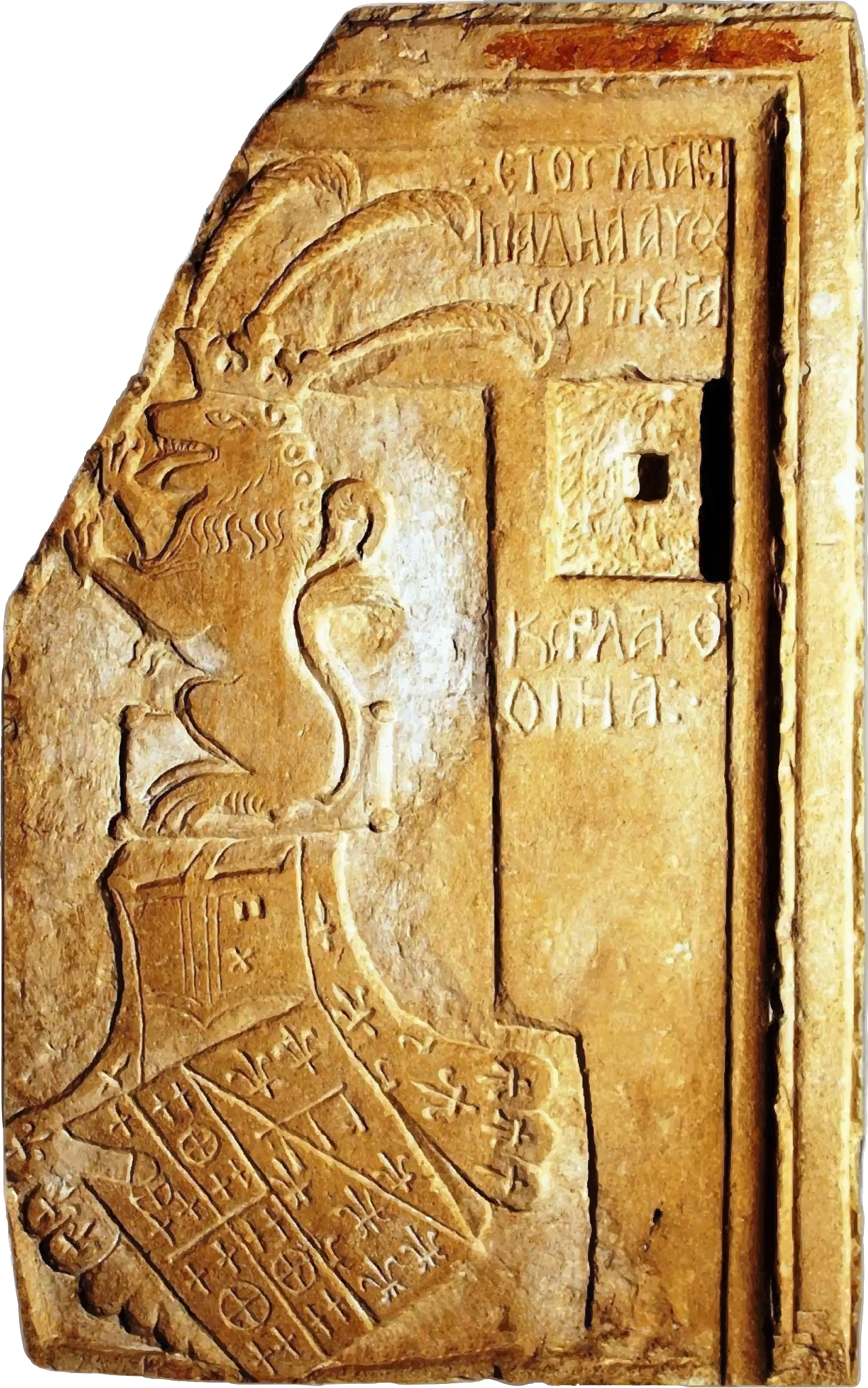
- Coat of arms of the Thopia family

Princess Consort of Zeta
- Tenure: 1407–1412
- Predecessor: Jelena Lazarević
- Successor: Boglia Zaharia
- Spouses: Balsha III (m. 1407; ann. 1412)
- Issue: Jelena Balsha
- House: Thopia
- Father: Niketa Thopia
- Mother: Daughter of Komnen Arianiti or Daughter of Maurizio Bua Sgouros

Mara Thopia (Albanian: Mara Topia), was a member of the Albanian Thopia family and the daughter of Niketa Thopia, the Lord of Krujë.

== Life ==
Mara was the daughter of Niketa Thopia. The identity of Mara's mother is disputed. According to Shuteriqi, she was the daughter of Komnen Arianiti. Meanwhile, Karl Hopf suggests that Niketa Thopia married the daughter of Maurizio Bua Sgouros. Much isn't known about her early life. Mara married Balsha III in 1407. They had one daughter Jelena Balsha who was named after Balshas mother. Mara's father and her husband allied to drive out the Venetians. It is unknown when Balsha III divorced Mara but he was remarried to Boglia Zaharia by late 1412 or the beginning of 1413. Mara Thopia is also the Grandmother of Catherine of Bosnia. Who was the Queen of the Kingdom of Bosnia.

== Family tree ==
Ancestry of Mara Thopia

8. Andrea I Thopia
4. Karl Thopia
9. Hélène of Anjou
2. Niketa Thopia
10. Unknown
5. Unknown
11. Unknown
1. Mara Thopia
12. Unknown
6. Maurizio Bua Sgouros
13. Unknown
3. Unknown Name
14. Unlnown
7. Unknown Name
15. Unknown

== See also ==
- Thopia family
- Principality of Albania (medieval)
