= Aleksa Đurašević =

Aleksa Đurašević—Lješ
- voivode
- Coat of arms
- Born: mid-14th century
- Died: after 1427
- Buried: Kom Monastery
- Noble family: Crnojević
- Father: Radič Crnojević
- Mother: Jelena
- Occupation: vojvoda of the Serbian Despotate

Aleksa Đurašević Crnojević (Serbian Cyrillic: Алекса Ђурашевић Црнојевић, fl. 1413–27), known as Lješ (Љеш) was the lord of Paštrovići (a coastal tribe) of the Lordship of Zeta and a voivode of the Serbian Despotate, alongside his older brother Đurađ.

== Life ==
Đurađ and his brother Aleksa (Lješ) were lords of the territory of Paštrovići (Luštica and hills above Kotor and Budva) during the reign of Balša III. The Đurašević family was a branch of the Kalođurđević family. Its members held the most distinct positions in the court of Balša III.

After the death of Balša III they refused Venetian invitations to switch sides and to accept Venetian suzerainty remaining loyal to new lord of Zeta, Serbian Despot Stefan Lazarević. They controlled 10 salt ponds in Grbalj valley near Kotor. Đurađ and his brother Aleksa built the Kom Monastery in the period between 1415 and 1427, when Upper Zeta was held by the Crnojevići.

On 10 March 1420 Venetians promised to appoint Đurađ and his brother Aleksa (Lješ) as governors of Budva.

Ancestors of Aleksa Đurašević

16. kefalija Ilija
8. Đuraš Ilijić
4. Crnoje Đurašević
2. Radič Crnojević
1. Lješ
3. Jelena

== Sources ==
- Fine, John Van Antwerp (1994). The Late Medieval Balkans: A Critical Survey from the Late Twelfth Century to the Ottoman Conquest. University of Michigan Press. ISBN 978-0-472-08260-5.
- Bešić, Zarij M. (1970). Istorija Crne Gore / 2. Crna gora u doba oblasnih gospodara (in Serbian). Titograd: Redakcija za istoiju Crne Gore. OCLC 175122851.
