= Stefan Crnojević =

Serbian noble

- Lord of Zeta
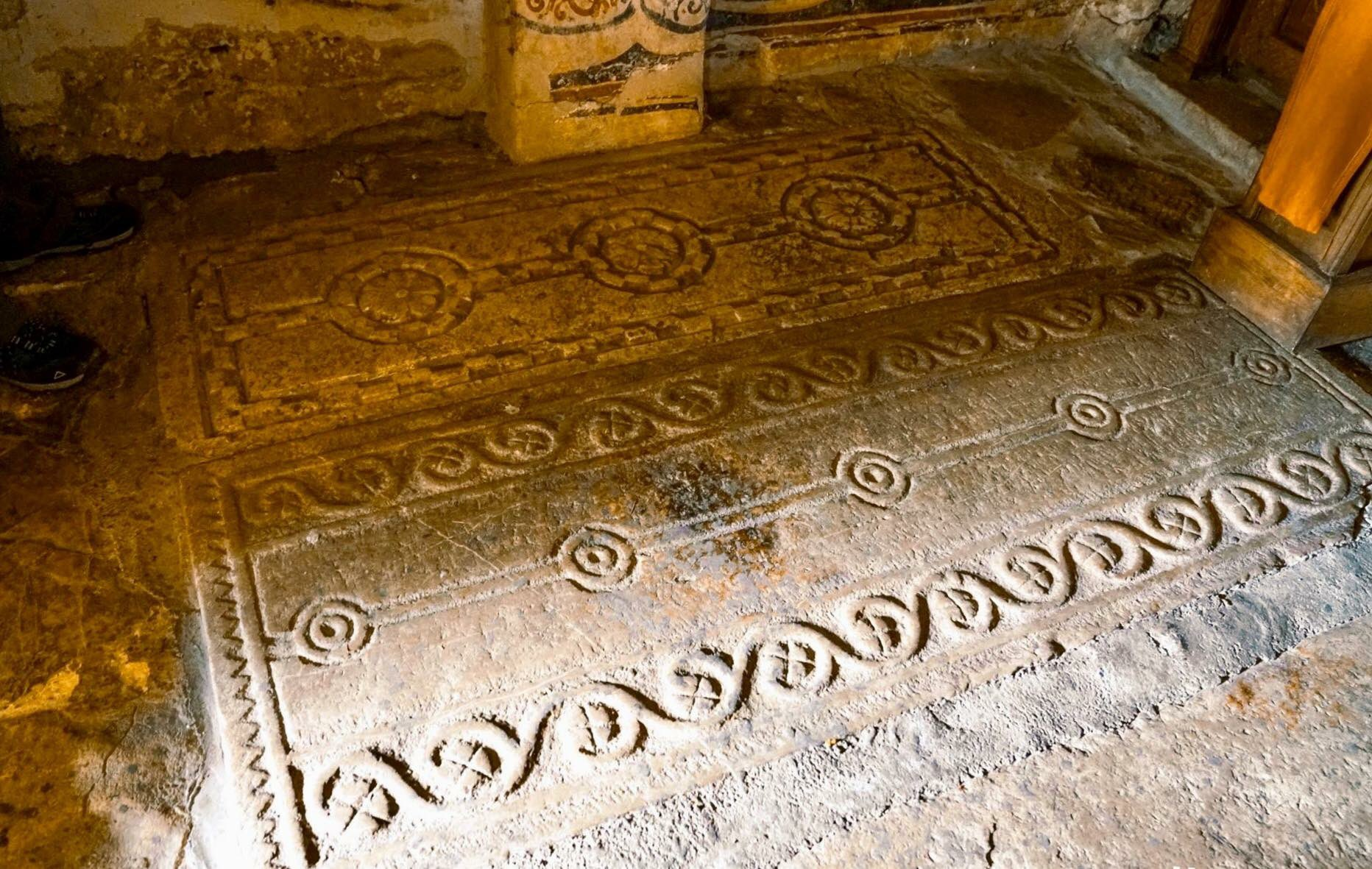
- Tombstone of Stefan Crnojević (bottom) and his wife Mara Kastrioti (top) in the Church of the Assumption of the Holy Mother of God at Kom Monastery.

- Coat of arms
- Reign: 1451–1465
- Predecessor: Gojčin Crnojević
- Successor: Ivan Crnojević
- Died: 1465
- Buried: Kom Monastery
- Noble family: Crnojević
- Spouse: Mara Kastrioti
- Issue: Ivan Crnojević; Andrija; Božidar
- Father: Đurađ Đurašević Crnojević
- Mother: Busha Zaharia

Stefan Crnojević (Serbian Cyrillic: Стефан Црнојевић), known as Stefanica (Стефаница; fl. 1426–1465) was the Lord of Zeta between 1451 and 1465. Until 1441, as a knyaz he was one of many governors in Upper Zeta, which at that time was a province of the Serbian Despotate. He then aligned himself with the Bosnian duke, Stefan Vukčić Kosača, and remained his vassal until 1444 when he accepted Venetian suzerainty. In Venetian–held Lezhë, on 2 March 1444, Stefan and his sons forged an alliance with several noblemen from Albania, led by Skanderbeg, known as the League of Lezhë. In 1448 he returned under suzerainty of Serbian Despot Đurađ Branković. In 1451, Stefan took over the leadership of the Crnojević family and became the ruler of a large part of Zeta, hence the title Gospodar Zetski (transl. Lord of Zeta).

== Early life and family ==
Stefan was born as the third son of Đurađ Đurašević Crnojević, and his mother Busha Zaharia was the daughter of Albanian nobleman Koja Zaharia of the Zaharia family. Stefan had three brothers: Đurašin Đurašević, Gojčin Crnojević and a brother with an unknown name and historical role. The earliest documents which mentions him is from 1426. Stefan was nicknamed "Stefanica".

Stefan had three sons, Ivan, Andrija and Božidar, who in other sources is mentioned as his brother. Historians from Ragusa always mentioned the lands of Balšić and Crnojević family as Zeta and considered it as part of Serbia to distinguish it from other areas.

== Reign ==
=== Vassalage ===
Crnojević family properties

At adulthood, Stefan became one of the many noblemen who governed parts of Zeta within the Serbian Despotate, but did not agree with the other Crnojević members and pursued his goals on his own, outside the mainstream of the family. With the temporary Ottoman capture of the Serbian Despotate's main continental territories in 1441, Despot Đurađ Branković came from Ragusa to Zeta to organize resistance and restore his control over the occupied parts. His attempt failed and resulted with the blinding of the despot's two captured sons in retaliation. With his departure back to Hungary, Stefan aligned himself with the Bosnian duke, Stefan Vukčić Kosača. At the end of September 1441 Kosača captured the territory of upper Zeta on the left bank of Morača. Stefan Crnojević, who represented the whole Crnojević family, joined him in this campaign and was awarded by Kosača with control over five villages. He kept two of them (Goričane and Kruse) under his control and gave the other three to his brothers.

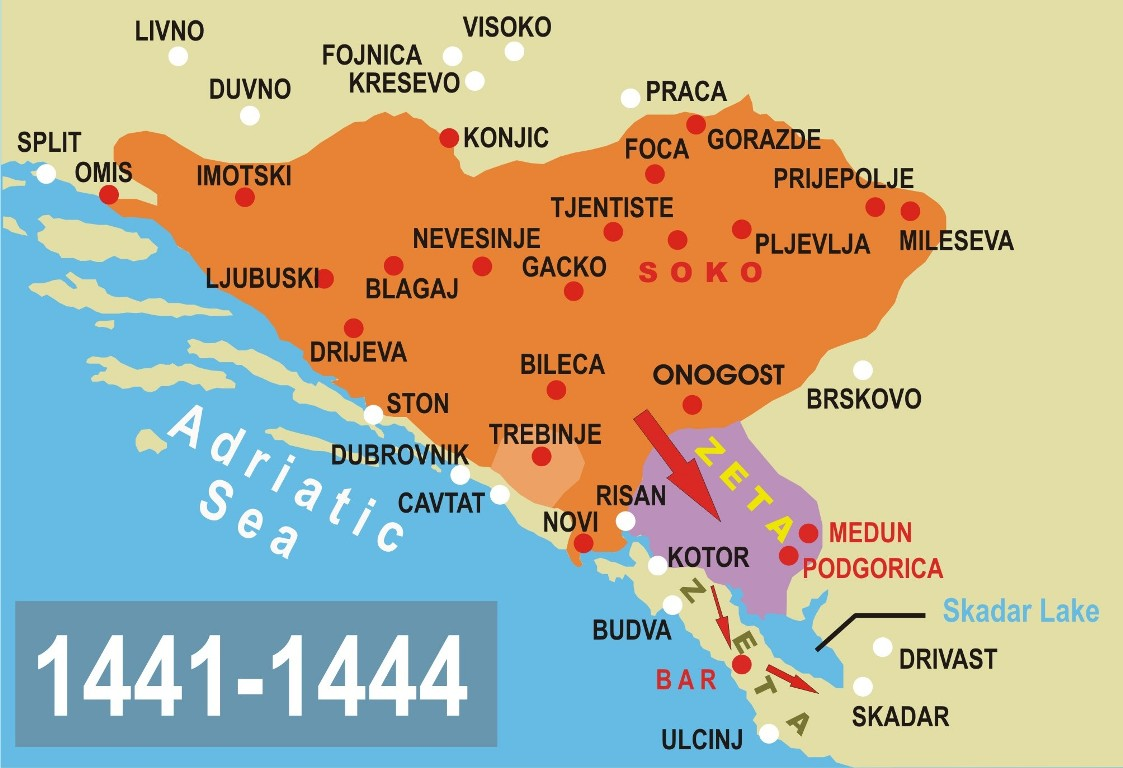
Stefan Vukčić Kosača's offensive into Zeta (1441–44). Podgorica and Medun, in Upper Zeta, and Bar, in Lower Zeta, were conquered.

Stefan married the Albanian princess Mara Kastrioti, the oldest daughter of the Lord of Mat Gjon Kastrioti. This family link became really important when in November 1443 Gjon's son and Mara's brother, Gjergj Kastrioti Skanderbeg rebelled in Albania against his Ottoman sovereign. According to Vasilije Petrović-Njegoš Stefan sent soldiers under the command of Božidar to help Skanderbeg in his fight against Ottomans, but Lekë Dukagjini and members of Zaharia family ambushed and killed them.

Siege of Bar: 1. Altoman offensive; 2. Stefan Crnojević offensive; 3. Paštrovići offensive; 4. Venetian-supporting Mrkojevići; 5. Venetian properties.

In 1444 Stefan Crnojević found strong new protectors in the Venetian Republic. In Venetian-held Lezhë on 2 March 1444 Stefan and his sons forged an alliance (League of Lezhë) with several noblemen from Albania, including Skanderbeg. With the restoration of the Serbian Despotate after the Crusade, Stefan gave his loyalty to Despot Đurađ Branković in 1448. Together with Branković and Skanderbeg he attacked Venetian held Bar and Ulcinj. Venetians were reluctant to fight against Serbian Despotate and had intention to estrange Branković and Skanderbeg. In July 1448 Jakov Dolfin, the governor of Bar, was victorious in the battle against Altoman's forces whose part was commanded by Stefan.

=== Lord of Zeta ===
After the disappearance of Stefan's brother Gojčin Crnojević from political life in 1451, Stefan took over the leadership of the house of Crnojević and became the ruler of a large part of Zeta. Stefan was never good with his brothers and always led politics on his own. To strengthen his position, he decided to immediately seek foreign protection. In 1452 he allied himself with Venice and recognized its authority over the region and was subsequently entitled Duke of Upper Zeta. The reasons of the alliance are related to his anticipation of the downfall of the Serbian Despot. Venetan doge Francesco Foscari wrote a letter to Stefan in 1455 asking him to return to Budva its territory he captured. In 1455 the Ottomans invaded Serbia and conquered all of its territories south of the Western Morava river, completely cutting Zeta off from the core of the Despotate. Therefore, Duke Stefan Crnojević along with representatives from all 51 municipalities from Upper Zeta signed an agreement the same year with the Venetians in Vranjina, by which Upper Zeta accepted Venetian rule. Venice came to rule only the cities, while all internal affairs were left to duke Stefan. The Republic of Venice also bound itself not to mettle with the ecclesiastical authority Serbian Orthodox Metropolitan of Zeta in any way. Montenegro slowly became the name of Stefan's Zetan realm. He reigned peacefully without the intervention of Venice and the Ottomans until his death in late 1464 or the beginning of 1465, when his son Ivan succeeded him.

== Family tree ==
Ancestry of Stefan Crnojević

8. Crnoje Đurašević
4. Radič Crnojević
9. Unknown
2. Đurađ Đurašević
10. Unknown
5. Jelena
11. Unknown
1. Stefan Crnojević
12. Nikollë Zaharia
6. Koja Zaharia
13. Unknown
3. Busha Zaharia
14. Lekë I Dukagjini
7. Bosa Dukagjini
15. Unknown

== Sources ==
- Božić, Ivan (1979). Nemirno pomorje XV veka [The Restless Sea of the 15th Century] (in Serbian). Srpska književna zadruga.
- Bešić, Zarij M. (1970), Istorija Crne Gore / 2. Crna gora u doba oblasnih gospodara. (in Serbian), Titograd: Redakcija za istoiju Crne Gore, OCLC 175122851
- Schmitt, Oliver Jens (2001), Das venezianische Albanien (1392-1479), München: R. Oldenbourg Verlag GmbH München, ISBN 3-486-56569--9
- Ćirković, Sima (1964). Историја средњовековне босанске државе [History of the medieval Bosnian state] (in Serbian). Srpska književna zadruga.
- Ćirković, Sima (2004). The Serbs. Malden: Blackwell Publishing. ISBN 9781405142915.

Stefan Crnojević Crnojević family Born: unknown Died: 1465
| Preceded by Gojčin Crnojević | Lord of Upper Zeta; 1451–1465 | Succeeded by Ivan Crnojević |
