= Gjergj Spani =

Gjergj Spani or Shpeni (Latin: Georgius Hispanus) (c. 1415 – 1458) was an Albanian physician, internist, and surgent from Shkodra who lived and worked in Kotor, Ragusa and Padua.

He was the son of Nikola. Spani went to study to medicine in Paris where he graduated as a medical doctor and later received a magister doctorate in Ragusa. On April 29, 1439, he worked as a physician in Kotor and on December 29, 1447, Spani married a girl named Tomazina and they had two sons and two daughters. One of his sons, Pashku, became a doctor. One of Spani's grandsons, Pjeter Marin Spani, was a doctor.

Spani was also a doctor who served in Bosnian and Montenegrin cities where he provided medical care for Stjepan Vukčić Kosačas wife Jelena Balsic. He also provided care for Bosnian prince Petar Vojsalić. Spani stayed in Bosnia for three months in 1446. Stjepan Vukčić asked Spani to provide medical care for Bosnian prince Ivaniš Pavlović (1441–1450). On August 8, 1449, Spani was allowed by the Ragusan authorities to help Montenegrin prince Gojčin Crnojević. Spani is mentioned in several Ragusan documents, one dating April 18, 1444. He served for 11 years between 1444 and 1455.

He spent the rest of his life in Padua and Kotor until his death in 1458.
