= Niketa Thopia =

14th-century Albanian nobleman

Niketa Thopia Niketa Topia
- Lord of Krujë
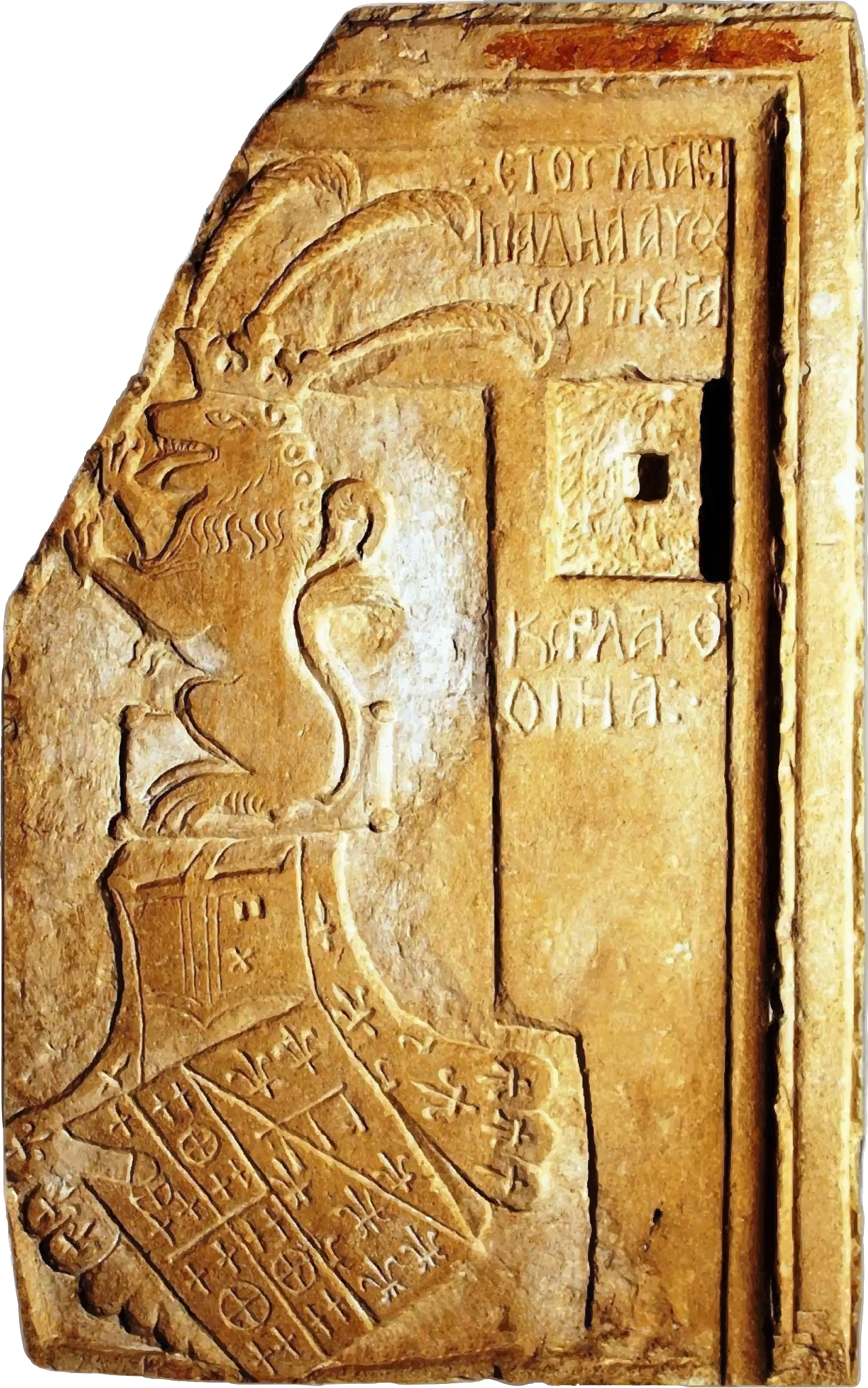
- Coat of arms of the Thopia family

Lord of Krujë
- Reign: 1392—1394; 1403–1415
- Predecessor: Helena Thopia
- Born: Unknown; Principality of Albania
- Died: 1415; Krujë, Princedom of Albania
- Spouse: Daughter of Komnen Arianiti or Daughter of Maurizio Bua Sgouros
- Issue: Mara Thopia
- House: Thopia
- Father: Karl Thopia
- Mother: Unknown
- Religion: Roman Catholic

Niketa Thopia (Albanian: Niketa Topia, Latin: Nicetas Thopia; fl. 1388 – d. 1415), also known as Nikola, was the Lord of Krujë between 1392—1394 and 1403–1415. He was a member of the Albanian Thopia family and an illegitimate son of Karl Thopia, the Prince of Albania (r. 1368–1388).

== Life ==
Niketa Thopia was an illegitimate son of Albanian prince Karl Thopia born to an unknown mother. Together with his sister Maria Thopia, they are Karl's only recognized illegitimate children. After his father’s death in 1388, Helena Thopia his older sister inherited control of Krujë. After her marriage to Marco Barbarigo, a Venetian nobleman, he became the actual ruler of her lands. Moreover, his older brother Gjergj Thopia succeeded their father as Prince of Albania. Niketa, on the other hand inherited a territory south of Durazzo.

Mark Barbarigo briefly held his and Helen’s possessions under Venetian suzerainty. However, facing new threats from the Ottomans, he eventually accepted Ottoman suzerainty. This decision allowed him to maintain control over Krujë and his other lands extending to Durrës. No longer viewing himself as a Venetian deputy, he began raiding Venetian lands near Durrës. In 1392, amid the ongoing hostilities between her husband and the Venetians, Helen's half-brother, Niketa Thopia, a loyal Venetian supporter, attacked the city of Krujë, forcing Mark Barbarigo to seek refuge with the Balsha family.

After the death of Sultan Bayezid in 1402, many Albanian lords, including Niketa Thopia, Gjon Kastrioti and Koja Zaharija recognized Venetian suzerainty. The Venetians were interested in having some buffer zone between them and the advancing Ottoman army.

After the death of Kostandin Balsha in 1402, Niketa Thopia swiftly seized control of the city of Krujë from his sister Helena Thopia in 1403, acting independently. Given his previous loyalty to the Venetians, they soon accepted his action, and by 1404, officially recognized him as the governor of Krujë. However, despite his formal vassal status, Niketa Thopia began to assert greater autonomy in the region. By 1410, he had extended his influence over much of the territory between Krujë and the lower Shkumbi River, effectively positioning himself not just as a Venetian vassal, but as an independent ruler whose interests aligned with Venice more as an ally than a direct deputy.

From his marriage, Thopia had one daughter, Mara Thopia. She married Balsha III in 1407 and had a daughter Jelena Balsha, named after her grandmother Jelena Lazarević. Balsha III and Niketa entered an alliance in order to drive out the Venetians. Niketa then started to be a mediator between Balsha and Venetians during the First Scutari War. Balsha III divorced his wife, Mara Thopia as relations with Niketa Thopia had soured due to an incident where Theodor Corona Musachi captured Niketa in a skirmish, likely around late 1411, and held him as a prisoner. After being released from jail in July 1413, Niketa Thopia returned to Krujë, where he resumed his role as the administrator for the Venetians. However, shortly thereafter, certainly by early 1415, he died.

After his death, the region experienced a period of instability. Mehmed I while upholding his treaties with Byzantium and Serbia and refraining from resuming attacks on them, Mehmed I saw the Albanian-Zetan region as an opportunity. Aiming to restore the Ottomans to their former stronghold in the area, he launched a major offensive there in 1415. His forces captured Krujë and several smaller forts throughout the region.

== Family ==
Niketa Thopia married either a daughter of Komnen Arianiti or a daughter of Maurizio Bua Sgouros. The couple had one child:

1. Mara Thopia, Princess of Zeta, married Balsha III in 1407, and they had one daughter, Jelena Balsha. Her father and husband allied to drive out the Venetians, and Balsha III divorced Mara by late 1412 or the beginning of 1413 to marry Boglia Zaharia. Mara is also the grandmother of Catherine of Bosnia, Queen of the Kingdom of Bosnia.

== Family tree ==
Ancestors of Niketa Thopia

8. Tanusio Thopia
4. Andrea Thopia
2. Karl Thopia
20. Charles II of Naples
10. Robert, King of Naples
21. Mary of Hungary
5. Hélène of Anjou
Unknown
1. Niketa
3. Uncertain

== See also ==
- Thopia family
- Principality of Albania (medieval)
- Saint Gjon Vladimir's Church

== Sources ==
- Fine, John Van Antwerp (1994), The Late Medieval Balkans: A Critical Survey from the Late Twelfth Century to the Ottoman Conquest, University of Michigan Press, ISBN 978-0-472-08260-5
- Spremić, Momčilo (2004), Ćulibrk, Jovan (ed.), Crkvene prilike u Zeti u doba Nikona Jerusalimca (in Serbian), Cetinje, Belgrade: Svetigora, Publikum, pp. 73–108, archived from the original on 2013-12-11

Preceded by Marco Barbarigo	Lord of Krujë; 1392—1394	Succeeded by Konstantin Balšić
Preceded by Konstantin Balšić	Lord of Krujë; 1403—1415	Succeeded by Ottoman Empire
