= Kom Monastery =

Serbian Orthodox monastery on Skadar Lake, Montenegro

Coordinates: 42°18′36.3″N 19°7′40.6″E

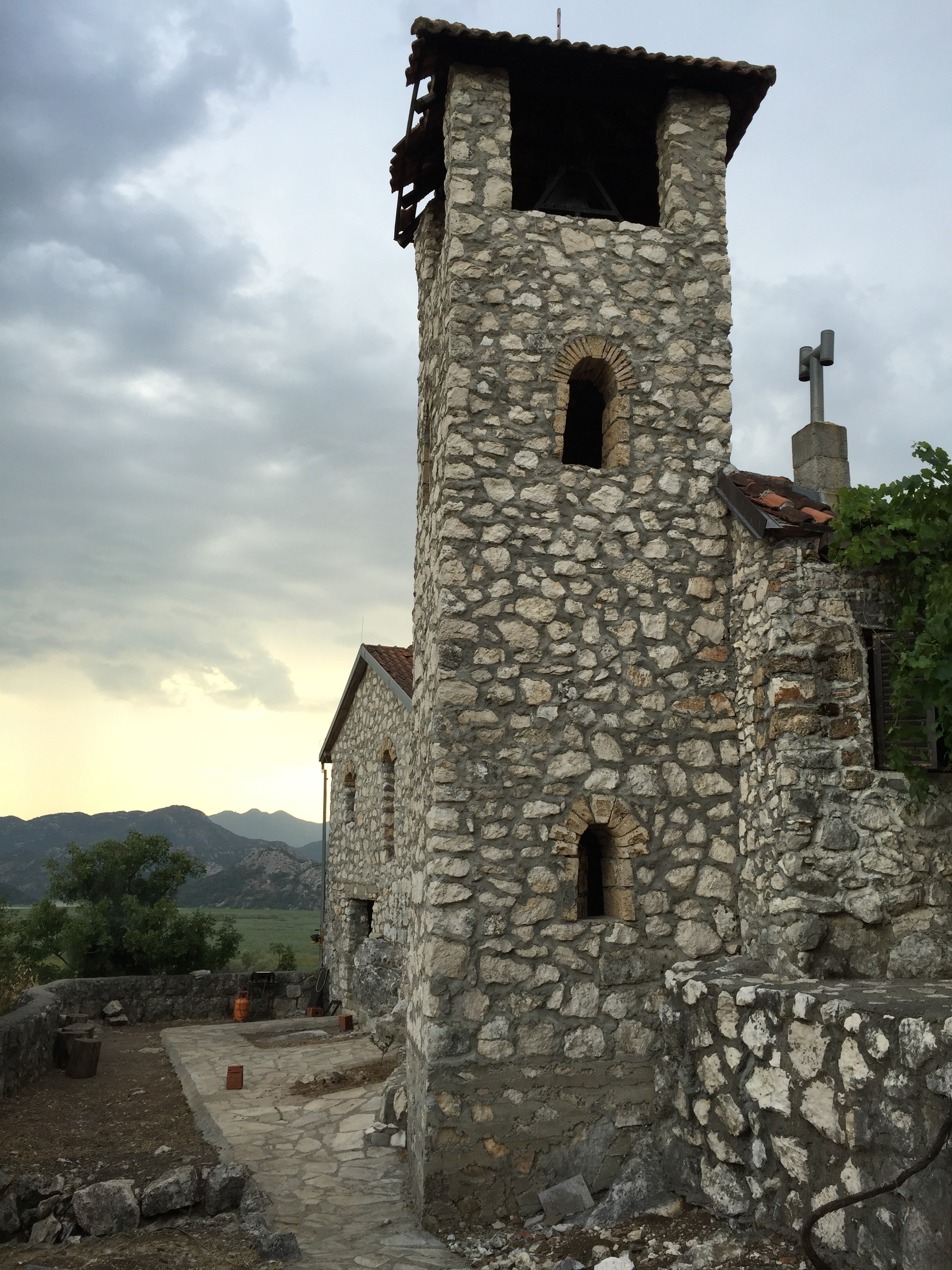

Religion
- Affiliation: Serbian Orthodox Church

Location
- State: Montenegro
- Interactive map of Kom Monastery

Architecture
- Groundbreaking: 1415
- Completed: 1427

The Kom Monastery (Serbian: Манастир Ком, romanized: Manastir Kom) is a Serbian Orthodox monastery in Montenegro. It is located on the small island of Odrinska gora, close to Žabljak Crnojevića, where the Crnojević River flows into the western section of Skadar Lake. The Kom Monastery was built between 1415 and 1427, as an endowment of Đurađ and Aleksa Đurašević, members of the Crnojević noble family. The graves of four members of the Crnojević family, including Stefan Crnojević and his wife, Mara Kastrioti—an Albanian princess from the House of Kastrioti are located there. The monastery continued with the practices of orthodox church, which had been greatly expanded during the earlier rule of the Balšići. The monastery also continued the tradition of building mausoleums. The oldest frescoes in the monastery are from the second half of the 15th century. For a short period of time, the monastery was the seat of the Zetan Metropolitanate. In the Kom Monastery in 1831, Petar II Petrović-Njegoš was appointed as the archimandrite of the Metropolitanate of Montenegro.

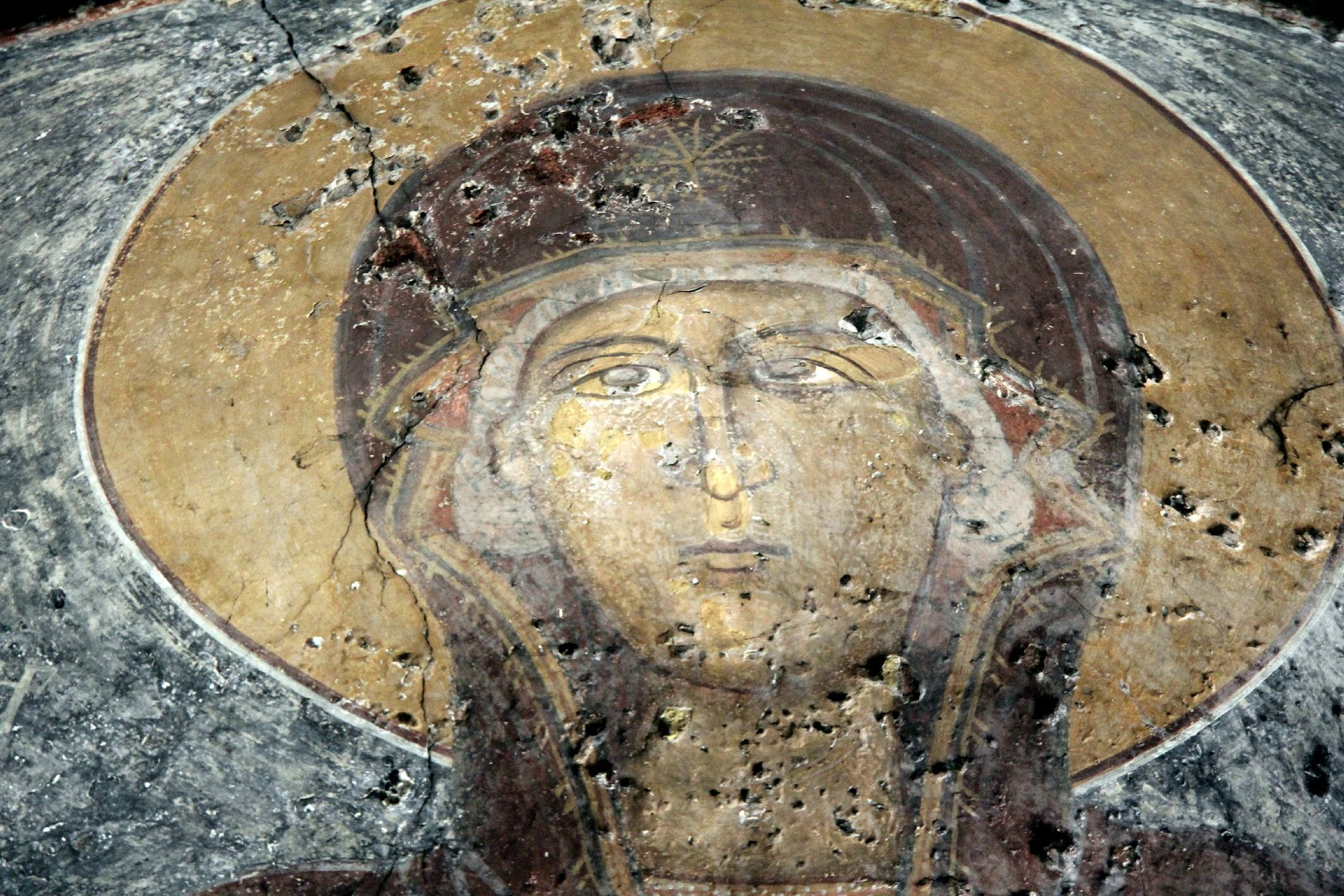
Fresco from the Kom Monastery

== See also ==
- List of Serbian monasteries

== Sources ==
- Dimitrije M. Kalezić (2002). I - O. Savremena administracija. p. 1010. ISBN 9788638706761. "КОМ, манастир са храмом посвећеним Успењу Прес- вете Богородице подигнутје између 1415. и 1427. год. на источним падинама острва Одринска гора, западно од Жабљака Црнојевића, као задужбина Ђурђа и Љеша Црнојевића, који се у историјским изворима иомињу између 1403. и 1435."
- Istorijski Leksikon Crne Gore: K-Per ISBN 86-7706-168-1
