= Battle of Tripolje =

Battle in 15th-century Serbia

Coordinates: 42°36′N 21°12′E

- Part of the Serbian–Ottoman wars
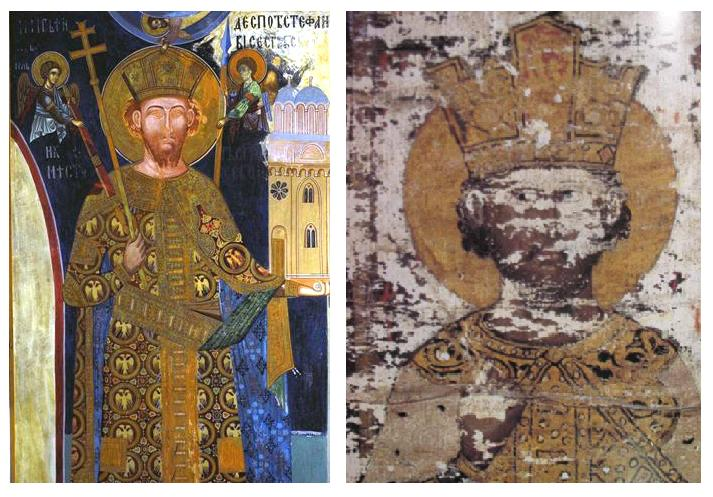
- Stefan Lazarević and Đurađ Branković
Date	21 November 1402
Location	Tripolje, near Gračanica, Serbian Despotate
Result	Despotate victory

Belligerents
Serbian Despotate; Principality of Zeta	District of Branković supported by: Ottoman Empire

Commanders and leaders
Stefan Lazarević; Vuk Lazarević; Đurađ II Balšić	Đurađ Branković

The Battle of Tripolje (Serbian Cyrillic: битка код Трипоља/бој на Трипољу), also known as the Battle of Gračanica (Грачаничка битка), was fought in November 1402 between the Serbian Despotate, ruled by the Lazarević dynasty, and the Branković family, aided by the Ottoman Empire.

Following the Ottoman defeat at Ankara in 1402, Serbian ruler Stefan Lazarević saw an opportunity to free himself of Ottoman overlordship. Awarded the high honorary title of despot by Byzantine Emperor Manuel II Palaiologos, Lazarević began to wield increasing autonomy in his political decision making. Following a quarrel said to have arisen because of his nephew Đurađ Branković's intent to join forces with the new Ottoman sultan, Lazarević had Branković imprisoned. Freed by a friend, Branković joined the Ottoman ranks and was set to fight Lazarević. Buoyed by Ottoman reinforcements, Branković set up in Kosovo, along the route through which Lazarević would return from the Adriatic coast to the Serbian interior. The two sides clashed at the field of Tripolje (near Gračanica) on 21 November 1402. The larger part of Lazarević's army, commanded by his brother Vuk, engaged Branković's forces while Stefan Lazarević clashed with the Ottomans. While Vuk experienced setbacks fighting Branković's forces, Stefan Lazarević encountered more success in fending off the Ottomans, thereby deciding the battle in his favor.

The Lazarević brothers fell out following the battle. Stefan Lazarević allied himself with Hungary in 1403, ending his subservience to the Ottomans, while the Lazarević–Branković conflict continued over the years.

== Background ==
The Ottoman defeat at the Battle of Ankara in July 1402, the subsequent capture by Timur of Sultan Bayezid I and his death in captivity in March 1403, which triggered the Ottoman Interregnum, presented an opportunity for the Serbian magnates to take advantage of the turmoil and wield more autonomy in their political decision making. Having fought on the side of the Ottomans, they returned from Ankara through Byzantine-held territory. The new political landscape made for closer Byzantine–Serbian cooperation, and in August 1402, at Constantinople, Byzantine Emperor Manuel II Palaiologos awarded one of the Serbian magnates, Stefan Lazarević, the very high title of Despot. Second only to imperial dignity, the title brought the bearer great honor. From Constantinople, Lazarević was hoping to pave the way for an independent Serbia. While staying there, he came to quarrel with another Serbian magnate, his nephew Đurađ Branković. Although the reasons remain unknown, fifteenth- and sixteenth-century Ragusan chronicler Mavro Orbini attributes the quarrel to Lazarević's suspicions that Branković wanted to join forces with Süleyman Çelebi, Bayezid's oldest son, who held power in Rumelia. The historian Dimitris Kastritsis notes that the rivalry between Branković and Lazarević dates back to the time of Bayezid, who had expelled Branković's father from his lands and granted some of them to Lazarević. Although Lazarević aimed to induce Emperor John VII to imprison Branković, it is not certain if he succeeded. In 1402, Lazarević ordered Branković imprisoned, but the latter spent little time in captivity, as he was freed with the help of a friend in September of that year. Branković immediately went to Süleyman Çelebi, whom he asked for troops to fight Lazarević.

== Prelude ==
The Lazarević–Branković conflict became an opportunity for the Ottomans, who readied for war, to regain the power they had once wielded in the Balkans. A Serbian contingent returning home from Asia Minor was abruptly attacked and destroyed near Edirne on the orders of an Ottoman commander. It became clear to Lazarević that the rest of his army could not return using that route. Branković and the Ottomans sought to prevent Lazarević and his brother Vuk from returning home. Branković's forces were joined by an Ottoman contingent, ordered by Süleyman to take control of local roads and prevent the Lazarević brother's crossing, which was expected to take place in the Branković-controlled territory of Kosovo. Still mistrustful of Branković's intentions, Süleyman sent one of his commanders to monitor Branković, to ensure that he was truly loyal. The Lazarević brothers and a detachment of about 260 men left Constantinople and embarked for the coast of Zeta by ship. Before landing in Zeta, Lazarević had become aware of Branković's plans; the brothers prepared for battle. They met with their brother-in-law Đurađ II Balšić, who supported them militarily and had their mother Milica raise an army in the Despotate. Lazarević's army made its way inland in late October 1402, on detouring roads towards the Žiča monastery. Branković's forces and the Ottoman contingent gathered near the Gračanica Monastery.

== Battle ==
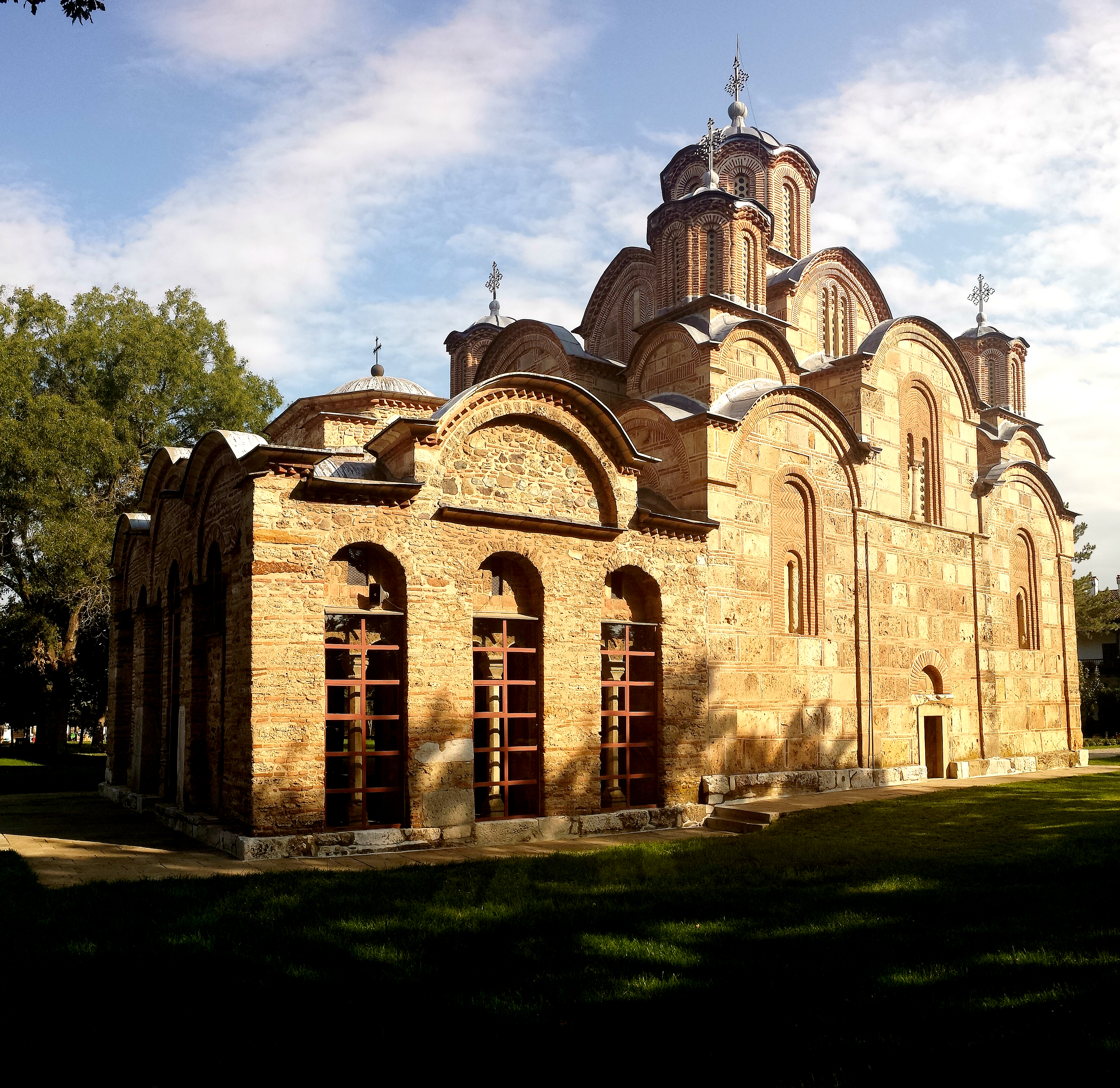
The 14th-century Gračanica Monastery, near the site of the battle

The two sides clashed on 21 November 1402, at Tripolje, near the Gračanica Monastery. The date of the battle coincided with the Presentation of Mary. Lazarević divided his army into two groups. Constantine of Kostenets, Lazarević's biographer (ca. 1431), wrote that the army was divided between the two brothers, in case one fell the other would be saved and stay a "good shepherd of the flock". Lazarević assigned the larger group to his brother Vuk, while he took the smaller group. It is unknown whether the army that Balšić contributed as security was present at the battle. Branković enjoyed significant Ottoman support.

While Lazarević engaged the Ottomans, Vuk engaged Branković's forces. Upon seeing Lazarević's bravery on the battlefield, it is said that many Ottoman soldiers felt like retreating. Lazarević had been famed for his bravery at the earlier battles of Nicopolis and Ankara. Among the Ottoman vassals were kesar Uglješa Vlatković and his troops. Vlatković is believed to have divulged the Ottomans' battle plans, and perhaps even turned on them during the battle, thereby contributing to its outcome in Lazarević's favor. Orbini claims that Vlatković discouraged the Ottomans by telling them that they would not be able to withstand the first rush. According to Orbini, Lazarević "chased Turks by the bunch". Meanwhile, Branković inflicted great damage on Vuk's forces. As he was unable to resist Branković's pressure, it was Lazarević who decided the battle. Ultimately, Branković and the Ottomans were decisively defeated.

Constantine of Kostenets wrote how Lazarević "bloodied the right hand of his" in battle. Orbini wrote that Lazarević won the battle "more with strategy than the courage of his soldiers". After the battle, the Lazarević brothers withdrew to the fortified city of Novo Brdo.

== Aftermath ==
Lazarević managed to take power in the country, bolstered by the reputation and work of his mother Milica, who was also politically active. The Lazarević–Branković conflict continued. In December 1402, the Republic of Ragusa expressed great regret regarding the conflicts in Serbia. Sultan Bayezid died in Tatar captivity in March 1403, which ignited a war between his four sons. There are accounts that Lazarević and Süleyman agreed to a truce shortly after the battle. Through the Gallipoli treaty in early 1403, Süleyman promised not to interfere in Serbia, on the condition that Lazarević accept his obligations towards the Ottoman Empire, which were in effect before the Battle of Ankara and consisted primarily of tribute and military support. Lazarević reneged on his previous obligations and continued fighting Branković and the Ottomans.

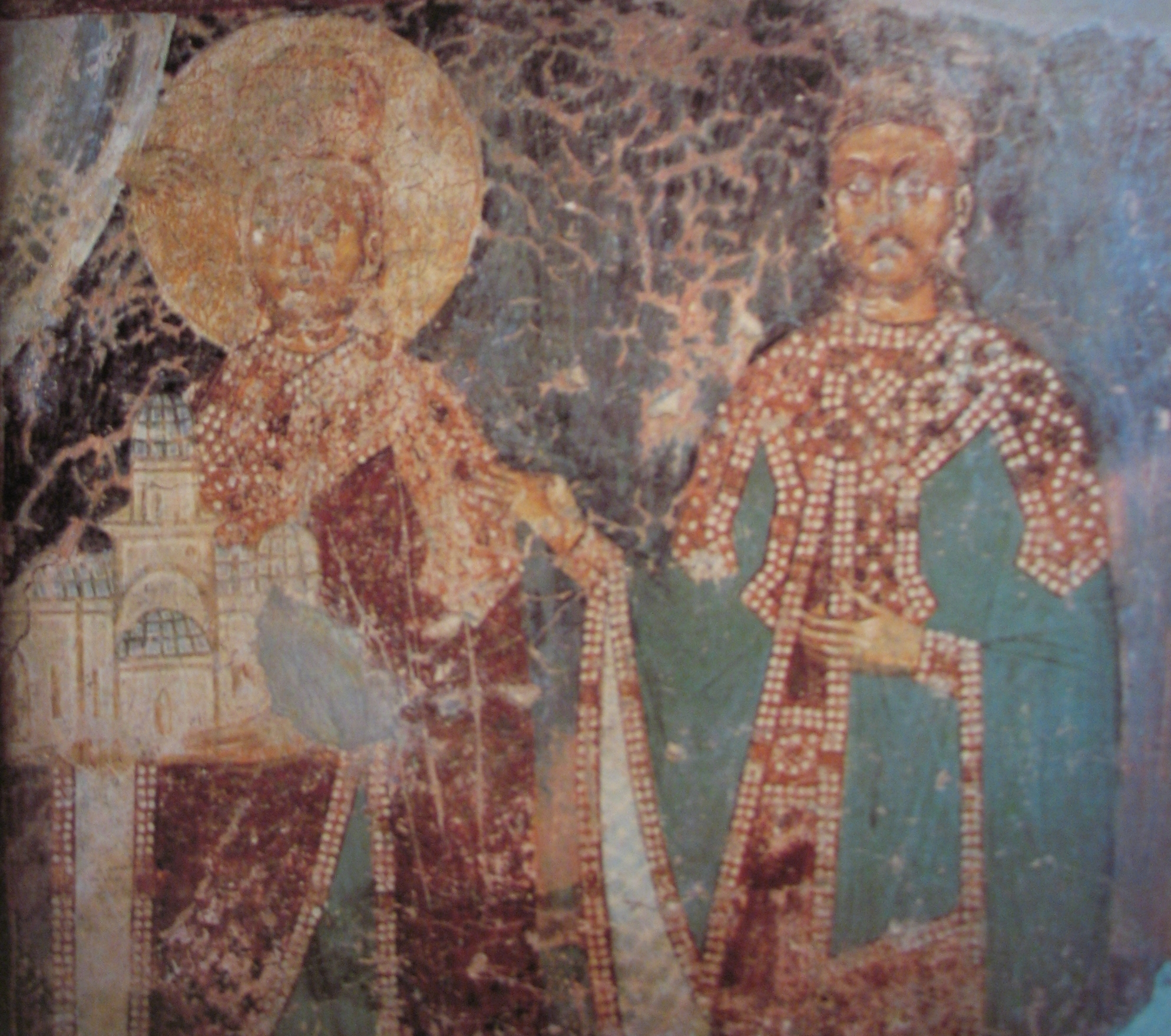
There was a rift between the Lazarević brothers following the battle

Around this time, the Lazarević brothers had a falling out. The rift stemmed from Vuk's perception that he had not emerged from the battle as a victor. Lazarević complained about the casualties under Vuk's command and wanted him to train in the art of war. Lazarević took to instructing his brother in military matters, but Vuk felt slighted after Lazarević said "some hard words" during instructions. Feeling hurt, with a gap between them, Vuk "waited some time, and finding the right time" ran off to Süleyman in the summer of 1403. Kalić believes that there was also a disagreement on the division of lands, while Blagojević believes that Lazarević's continued opposition to the Ottomans in light of the truce played a role. Vuk thus decided to leave the country and enter the ranks of Süleyman Çelebi.

To retain his independence from the Ottomans, who were closing in from the south, Lazarević turned to the Kingdom of Hungary, which could be counted on militarily. After becoming a Hungarian vassal in 1403, Lazarević was offered peace by the Ottomans on his terms, and the Despotate was no longer a subject of the Ottoman Empire. Vuk returned to the Despotate shortly thereafter and the brothers ruled in accord. The Ottoman–Serbian peace, Hungarian–Serbian alliance, Hungarian ceding of large territories in the north to the Despotate, and the merger of Vlatković's province to Lazarević's domain resulted in Lazarević expanding his claims on all the Serbian lands.

== Annotations ==
1. Tripolje (Serbian Cyrillic: Трипоље, archaic: на Триполю, from tri–three and polje–field) was a field located near the Gračanica Monastery, at Kosovo Field. Kosovo Field was the site of the Battle of Kosovo in June 1389, in which Lazarević's father, Prince Lazar, lost his life fighting the Ottomans.
2. According to Purković, while Lazarević engaged the Ottomans, Vuk's forces were attacked by those of Branković. According to Kalić, Vuk was tasked with attacking Branković's forces while Lazarević began an assault against the Ottomans.

== Sources ==
- Bogdanović, Dimitrije; Mihaljčić, Rade; Ćirković, Sima; Kalić, Jovanka; Kovačević-Kojić, Desanka; Blagojević, Miloš; Babić-Đorđević, Gordana; Đurić, Vojislav J.; Spremić, Momčilo; Božić, Ivan; Pantić, Miroslav; Ivić, Pavle (1982). Kalić, Jovanka (ed.). Историја српског народа: Доба борби за очување и обнову државе (1371–1537). Belgrade: Srpska književna zadruga.
  - Blagojević, Miloš (1982). "Врховна власт и државна управа". Историја српског народа: Доба борби за очување и обнову државе (1371–1537). pp. 109–127.
  - Kalić, Jovanka (1982a). "Велики преокрет". Историја српског народа: Доба борби за очување и обнову државе (1371–1537). pp. 64–74.
- Kastritsis, Dimitris J. (2007). The Sons of Bayezid: Empire Building and Representation in the Ottoman Civil War of 1402–1413. Leiden, Netherlands: Brill. ISBN 978-90-04-15836-8.
- Purković, Miodrag (1978). Knez i despot Stefan Lazarević. Sveti arhijerejski sinod Srpske pravoslavne crkve.
- Ruvarac, Ilarion (1879). "Прилошци..." Гласник. 47. Državna štamparija.
- Trifunović, Đorđe, ed. (1979). "Stefan Lazarević". Књижевни радови. 477. Srpska književna zadruga.
