= Petar Vrankić =

German and Bosnian church historian (born 1947)

Petar Vrankić (born 1947) is a German and Croatian church historian.

== Biography ==
Vrankić was born in Glavatičevo near Konjic in SR Bosnia and Herzegovina, at the time part of Yugoslavia. He studied theology at the Faculty of Catholic Theology in Split and continued his education in Rome. Together with Želimir Puljić he was ordained a priest in 1974. After gaining licenciate in theology in 1976, Vrankić studied church history and related studies at the Pontifical Gregorian University in Rome, where he earned his PhD in 1980.

After he finished his education, Vrankić lectured church history and ecumenical theology at the Theological Seminary of Vrhbosna in Sarajevo. He moved to Augsburg, Germany in 1986 and started to lecture at the Faculty of Theology, University of Augsburg. He continued to write historical articles in Croatian. From 1998 until 2004 he lectured at the Pontifical University of the Holy Cross, and retired in 2012. He currently lives in Augsburg, where he continues to deal with church history.

Vrankić published in Croatian, Italian, German and English language.

== Works ==
=== German ===
- Vrankić, Petar (1998). Religion und Politik in Bosnien und der Herzegowina (1878-1918) [Religion and Politics in Bosnia and Herzegovina (1878-1918)]. Paderborn: Verlag Ferdinand Schöningh.

=== Italian ===
- Vrankić, Petar (1984). La Chiesa cattolica nella Bosnia ed Erzegovina al tempo del vescovo fra Raffaele Barišić, 1832-1863 [The Catholic Church in Bosnia and Herzegovina at the time of bishop Raffaele Barišić, 1832-1863]. Rome: Pontificia Universita Gregoriana Editrice Roma.
