= Radič Crnojević =

- Lord of Upper Zeta and Budva
- Coat of arms
- Died: May or April 25, 1396
- Noble family: Crnojević
- Spouse: Jelena
- Issue: Đurađ Đurašević; Aleksa Đurašević
- Father: Crnoje Đurašević
- Cause of death: Killed in battle

Radič Crnojević (Serbian Cyrillic: Радич Црнојевић, fl. 1392–1396) was a lord of the Crnojević family who maintained a domain in Upper Zeta. Radič later expanded his domain to parts of Lower Zeta, including Grbalj, Paštrovići and Budva. Radič was a son of Crnoje Đurašević.

== Life ==
Radič revolted against the Balšići who ruled the Lordship of Zeta. Radič frequently jeopardized the city of Kotor, maintaining bad relations with them. Radič also had maintained close relations with the Republic of Ragusa, and was granted Venetian citizenship on 30 November 1392.

Upper and Lower Zeta in 15th century.

The Zetan lord, Đurađ II, had problems that arose due to Zetan battles involving the Ottomans which Radič used to become independent of the Zetan lord. In late 1392, Đurađ II kidnapped the sanjak-bey of Skopje. Radič, with the help of his brothers Stefan and Dobrivoje, used this event to take control of Budva, as well as Saint Michael's Metohija, in 1392 from the Balšići, thus becoming the Master of Budva. Radič ruled Budva till his death in 1396.

Radič also led an expedition in Lezhë, seizing it from the Dukagjini's, expelling them in the process. However, Radič's reign was very temporary as the Dukagjinis retook Lezhë in early 1393.

== Death ==
In late April 1396, Radič and his brother Dobrivoje had made a significant move against Lord Đurađ II (Balšić) of Zeta. They took the region of Grbalj and laid siege to Kotor. Unable to take the town, the council of Kotor agreed to pay him tribute. Đurađ became disliked by the Orthodox Christian commonfolk by these events. The Orthodox Crnojevići's takeover was welcomed by the people, resulting in Paštrović's crossing over to Radič's side. On 25 April or May 1396, the duo moved to battle Đurađ himself. This was a grave mistake as Đurađ's forces completely defeated the Crnojevići and killed Radič, managing to get a hold over a part of the Crnojević domain. Duke Sandalj Hranić took the opportunity to conquer Budva after Radič's death, as well as marrying his widow, Jelena.

== Family ==
Radič married Jelena, of unknown origin. They had the following issue:

- Đurađ (fl. 1413–1435), lord of Paštrovići and voivode of the Serbian Despotate
- Aleksa "Lješ" (fl. 1413–1427), lord of Paštrovići and voivode of the Serbian Despotate
