= Balša III =

Member of the Balšić noble family

Balša III Балша III Balsha III
- Lord of Zeta
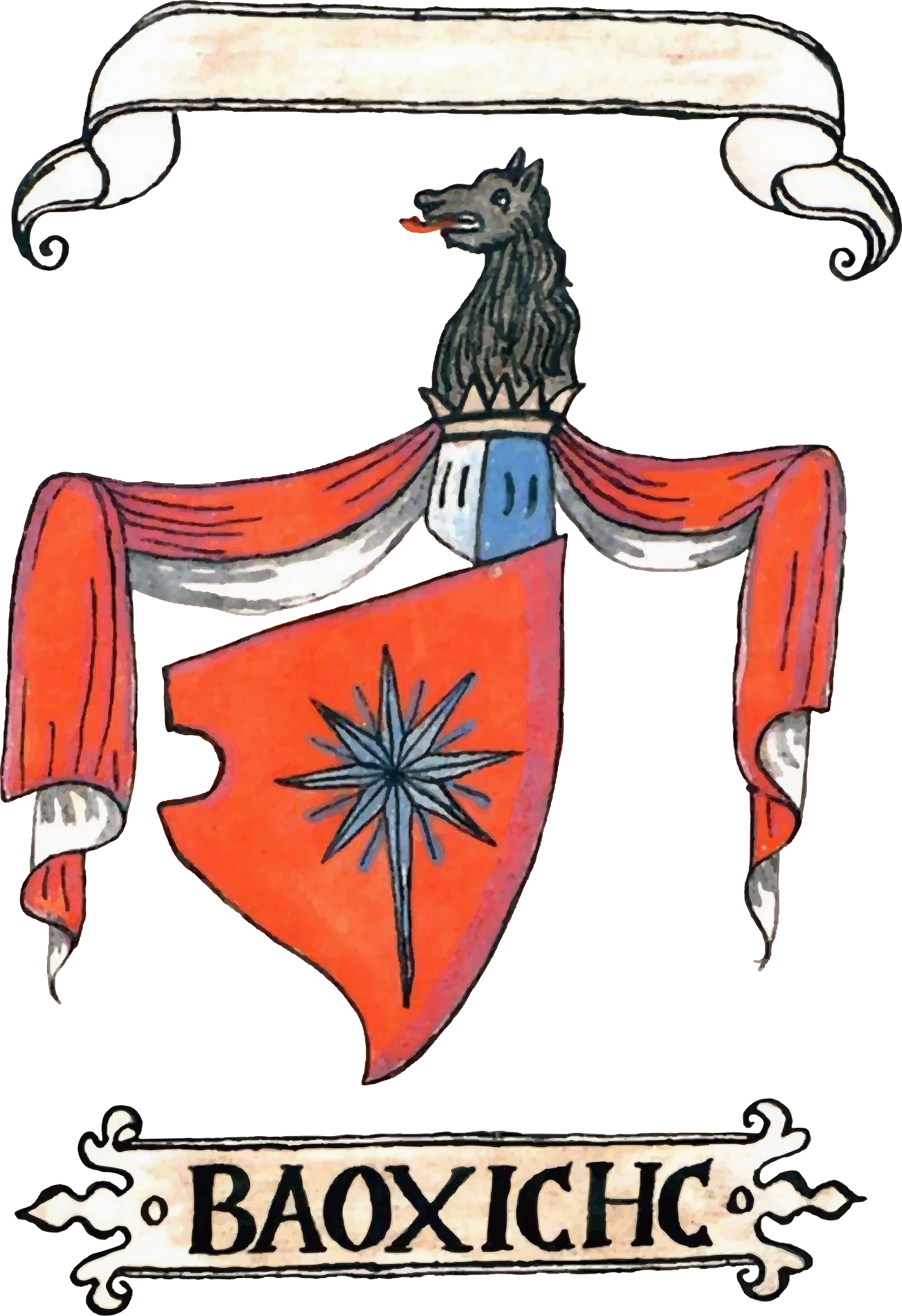
- Coat of arms of the Balšić family

Lord of Zeta
- Reign: April 1403 – 28 April 1421
- Predecessor: Đurađ II Balšić
- Successor: Stefan Lazarević
- Born: 1387
- Died: 28 April 1421 (aged 33–34); Belgrade, Serbian Despotate
- Spouse: Mara Thopia (m. 1407; div. 1412) Boglia Zaharia (m. 1412)
- Issue: Jelena Balšić; Unknown Son; Teodora Balšić
- House: Balšić
- Father: Đurađ II Balšić
- Mother: Jelena Lazarević

Balša III (Serbian Cyrillic: Балша III; Albanian: Balsha III) or Balsha III (1387 – 28 April 1421, in Belgrade) was the fifth and last ruler of Zeta from the Balšić noble family, from April 1403 to April 1421. He was the son of Đurađ II and Jelena Lazarević.

== Reign ==
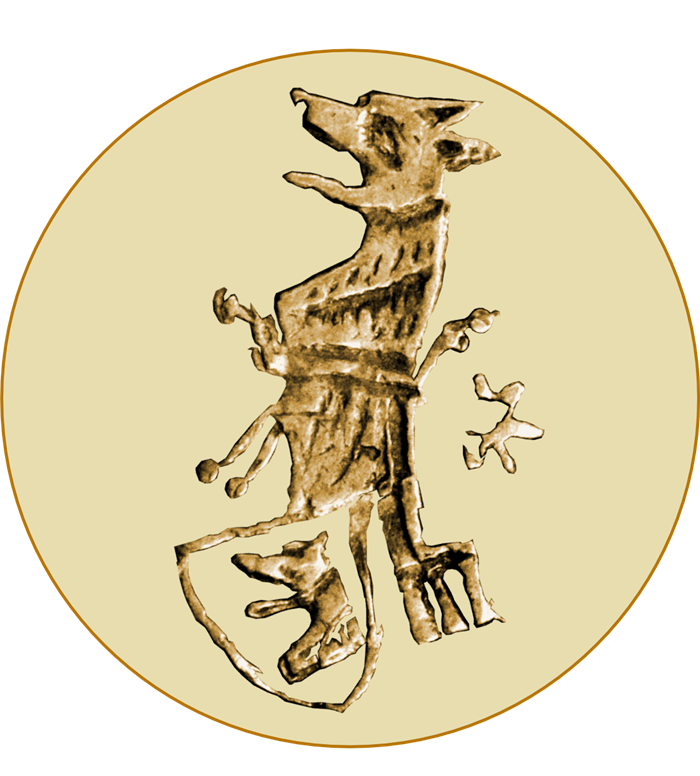
Coat of arms on Balša's coins

In April 1403, the seventeen-year-old Balša became the ruler of Zeta when his father Đurađ II died as a result of the injuries he had suffered at the Battle of Tripolje. As he was young and inexperienced, his main advisor was his mother, Jelena, a sister of the ruler of Serbia at the time, Stefan Lazarević. Under the influence of his mother, Balša reverted the order of the state religion, passing a law declaring Eastern Orthodox Christianity as the official confession of the state, while Roman Catholicism became a tolerated confession.

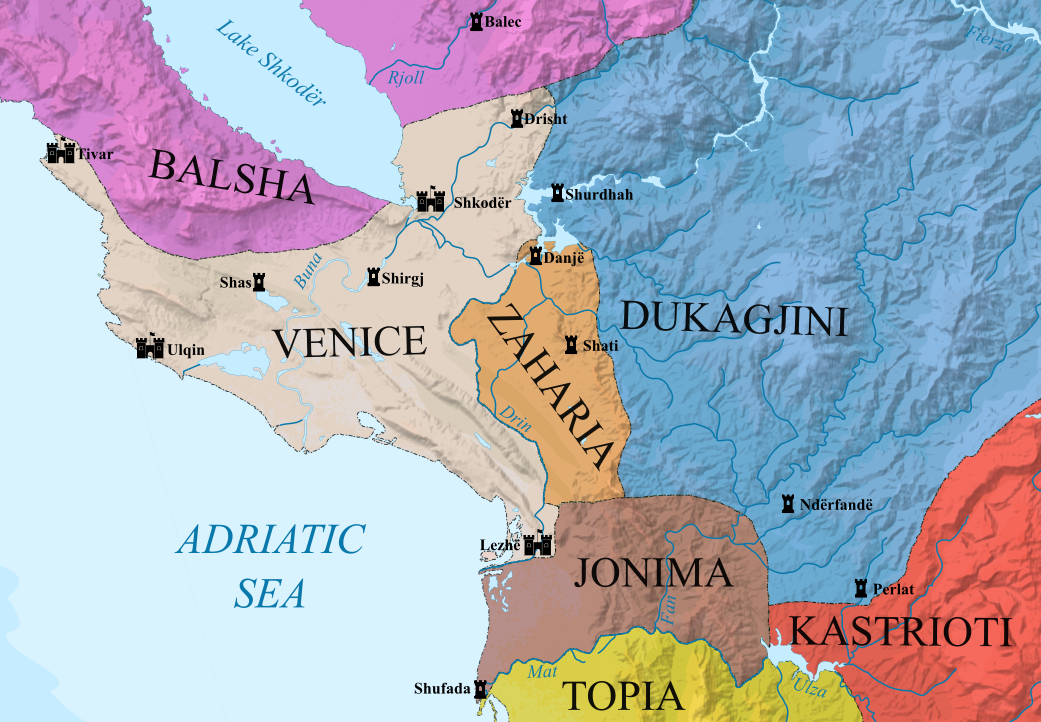
Recreated map of northern Albania c. 1406, a year into the First Shkodra War.

Balša waged the First Scutari War, a 10-year war, against Venice. In 1405, Ulcinj, Bar and Budva were seized by the Venetians. Balša then became a vassal to the Ottoman Turks. In 1409, however, Venice had purchased the rights to Dalmatia from King Ladislaus of Naples and began fighting for control of Dalmatian cities. After a huge effort, Balša seized Bar from the Venetians in 1412. Venice, pressed with difficulties, had no choice but to agree to return territories it had previously seized. In 1413 he built a church dedicated to Saint Nicholas at the Praskvica Monastery. According to a chapter Balša issued in 1417, he was probably a ktitor of the Moračnik Monastery.

Possessions of Venice and Balša III.

Balša had waged a new war against Venice, which was connected to the war with the Hungarians and the Turks. In 1418, he conquered Shkodër from the Venetians, but lost Budva and Luštica with its salt works. In 1419, he made an unsuccessful attempt to recapture Budva. He went to Belgrade to ask for aid from Stefan Lazarević, but never returned to Zeta. In 1421, before his death and under the influence of his mother, he passed the rule of Zeta to his uncle, Despot Stefan Lazarević.

== Marriage and issue ==
In 1407, Balša III married Mara Thopia, a daughter of Niketa Thopia. They had a daughter, Jelena Balšić (1411-1453), named after Balša's mother. In his second marriage, Balša III married Boglia Zaharia, a daughter of Koja Zaharia, in 1412 or at the beginning of 1413. They had a son (died in 1415) and a daughter, Teodora (died after 1456)

In 1424 Jelena Balšić married Stjepan Vukčić Kosača and was mother of Queen Catherine of Bosnia and Vladislav Hercegović. In 1415, Balša's only son and the only male descendant of the still Christian branch of the Balšić family died. Teodora married Petar Vojsalić, voivode of Bosnia.

== Annotations ==
- Name: His full name has been written as Balša Stracimirović (Serbian Cyrillic: Балша Страцимировић; last name is sometimes Balšić or Đurđević)

Preceded by Đurađ II	Lord of Zeta and the Coast; 1403–1421	Succeeded by Stefan Lazarević
