= Zeta under the Balšići =

Medieval principality in south-east Europe

Zeta Зета (Serbian) Zeta (Albanian)
- 1371–1421
- Coat of arms

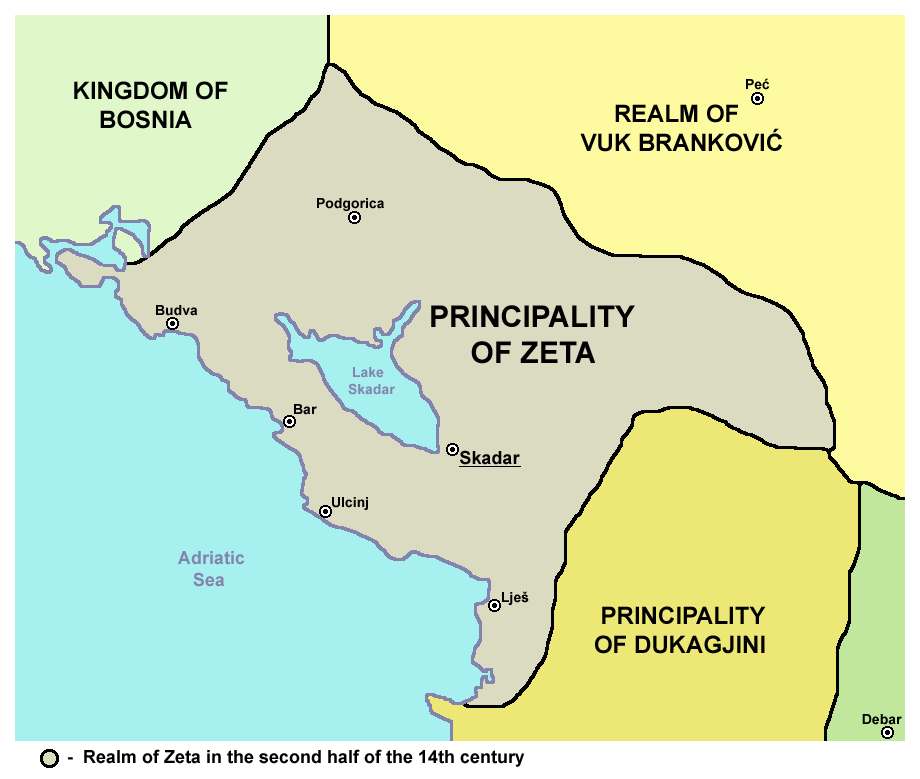
- Map of Zeta in the second half of the 14th century
- Capital: Ulcinj, Shkodra
- Common languages: Old Serbian (Old Slavic); Albanian (Gheg)
- Religion: Orthodox Christianity; Catholicism
- Government: Feudal monarchy
- Historical era: Medieval
  - Established: 1371
  - Unification with the Serbian Despotate: 1421
Preceded by
| Serbian Empire |
Succeeded by
| Serbian Despotate |
| Zeta under the Crnojevići |
| Principality of Dukagjini |
- Today part of: Montenegro; Albania; Serbia; Kosovo

Zeta (Serbian Cyrillic: Зета; Albanian: Zeta; Latin: Zenta or Genta) was one of the medieval polities that existed between 1371 and 1421, whose territory encompassed parts of present-day southern Montenegro and northern Albania, ruled by the House of Balšić.

Zeta was a crown land of the Grand Principality and Kingdom of Serbia, ruled by heirs to the Serbian throne from the Nemanjić dynasty. In the mid-14th century, Zeta was divided into Upper and Lower Zeta, governed by magnates. After Stefan Dušan (r. 1331–55), his son Stefan Uroš V ruled Serbia during the fall of the Serbian Empire, through a gradual disintegration of the Empire as a result of decentralization in which provincial lords gained semi-autonomy and eventually independence. The Balšići wrestled the Zeta region in 1356–1362 when they removed the two rulers in Upper and Lower Zeta. Ruling as lords, they empowered themselves and over the decades became an important player in Balkan politics. Zeta was united into the Serbian Despotate in 1421, after Balša III abdicated and passed the rule to his uncle, Despot Stefan Lazarević (maternally a Nemanjić).

== Background ==
Serbian Prince Desa Urošević conquered Duklja and Travunia in 1148, combining the title as "Prince of Primorje" (the Maritime) and co-ruled Serbia with his brother Uroš II Prvoslav from 1149 to 1153, and alone until 1162. In 1190, Grand Prince Stefan Nemanja's son, Vukan Nemanjić, asserted his right to the Dukljan crown. In 1219, the regent of Zeta and King Vukan's oldest son, Đorđe Nemanjić, became king of Duklja/Zeta, while Vukan's second son Stefan Vukanović built the Assumption of the Virgin Monastery in Morača.

Between 1276 and 1309, Zeta was ruled by Queen Helen, widow of King Stefan Uroš I. She restored around 50 monasteries in the region, most notably Saints Sergius and Bacchus on the Buna River. The name Crna Gora (Montenegro) was formally mentioned for the first time in 1296, by Stefan Milutin (son of Uroš I) in the charter of the Monastery of Saint Nicholas in Vranjina, to denote the highland region under Mount Lovćen, within the confines of Zeta. From 1309 to 1321, Zeta was co-ruled by the oldest son of King Milutin, Young King Stefan Dečanski. Similarly, from 1321 to 1331, Stefan's young son Stefan Dušan, the future Serbian King and Emperor, co-ruled Zeta with his father. Dušan "the Mighty" was crowned King in 1331, and ruled until he died in 1355. Stefan Uroš V, "the Weak" succeeded him, his epithet was given due to his weak rule of the Empire.

Later, Žarko held the Lower Zeta region: he is mentioned in records from 1356, when he raided some Ragusan merchants, not far from Sveti Srđ at Lake Skadar. Zeta itself was held by the widow of Dušan, Jelena, who at the time was in Serres where she had her court. The next year, in June, Žarko became a citizen of the Republic of Venice, where he was known as "baron lord of the Serbian King, with holdings in the Zeta region and Bojana of the maritime".

According to Mavro Orbini (1601), the Balšić family started to expand in Lower Zeta after the death of Emperor Dušan, during the weak rule of Emperor Uroš V. In 1360 they held a part of the land between Lake Skadar and the Adriatic Sea. The Balšić brothers continued into Upper Zeta, which was held by Đuraš Ilijić and his relatives, and killed Đuraš and had some of his relatives captured while the rest left the land, "and thus also ruled Upper Zeta". This took place after 1362.

== History ==
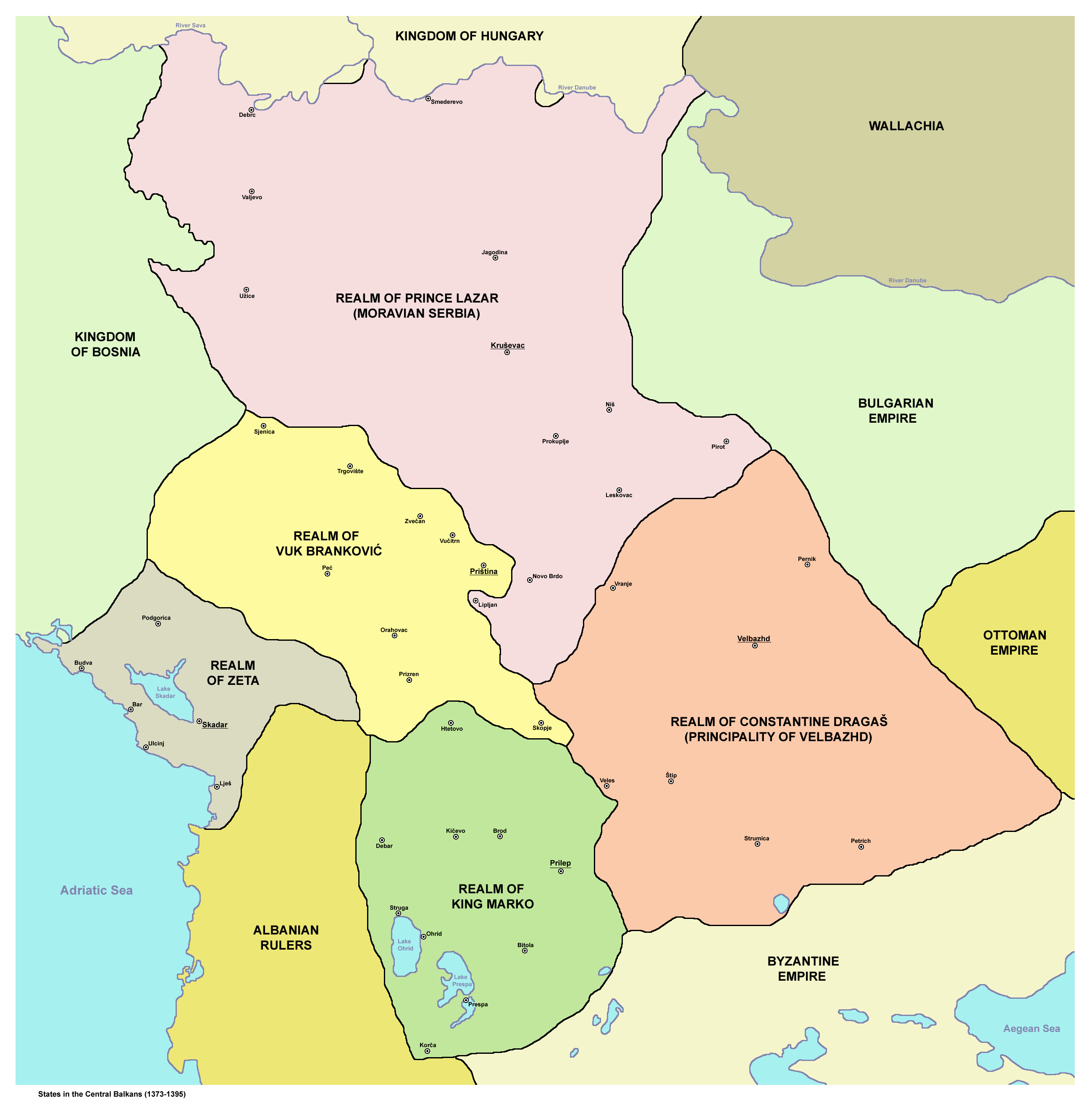
States in the Central Balkans (including Realm of Zeta of the House of Balšić) in the 14th century

=== Founding ===
The Balšići are mentioned in a charter issued in 1360 to the Republic of Ragusa by Emperor Stefan Uroš V, as provincial lords in the Zeta region. According to Mavro Orbin (l. 1563–1614), 'A poor Lord Balša', said to be 'kin to Nemanja' held only a village located between the Adriatic and Bojana river during the rule of Emperor Dušan (r. 1331–55) but after the death of the Emperor and following years under his son, Uroš V, by 1362 had taken over Lower Zeta, after removing vojvoda Đuraš Ilijić of Upper Zeta who had held the position since around 1326 (since Stefan Dečanski). Balša, together with his three sons Stracimir, Đurađ I and Balša II, conquered Upper Zeta and the towns of Shkodër, Kotor and Bar. Đurađ I ruled until 1378 and Balša II until 1385.

=== Đurađ I ===
Đurađ's rule extended from around 1362 to 1378. He had allied with King Vukašin Mrnjavčević, having married his daughter, Olivera, until Mrnjavčević's fall at the Battle of Maritsa (1371). Đurađ I ran Zeta as a modern ruler of the time. Zeta's institutions were functioning well, while the coastal towns enjoyed considerable autonomy. Commerce was well developed and enhanced by the existence of Zeta's currency, the dinar. Đurađ I allied with his neighbours Prince Lazar Hrebeljanović of Serbia, Ban Tvrtko I Kotromanić of Bosnia, Prince Nikola I Gorjanski and King Louis I of Hungary, to defeat the ambitious Nikola Altomanović in 1373. Despite this, the defeated and blinded Altomanović found refuge in Zeta until his death. While he was battling in the south of Kosovo, Đurađ's younger brother Balša II married Komnina, a close cousin of Emperor Stefan Dušan's wife, Jelena. Through the marriage, Đurađ II received a generous dowry in the land, including Vlorë, Berat, Kanina, and some additional strategically important regions. Upon the division of Altomanović's lands (in Herzegovina), the Balšićs took the towns of Trebinje, Konavle and Dračevica. Subsequent disputes over these towns led to a conflict between Zeta and Bosnia, led by Ban Tvrtko I. The fight was eventually won by Bosnia, supported by Hungary, after Đurađ died in 1378.

=== Balša II ===
In 1378, following Đurađ's death, his brother Balša II became the King of Zeta. In 1382, King Tvrtko I conquered Dračevica and built the town later known as Herceg-Novi. Both Tvrtko I and Balša II aspired to ascend to the throne of the Nemanjić dynasty.

During his rule, Balša II could not maintain the control of the feudal lords as his predecessor did. His power was strong only in the region around Shkodër and in the eastern part of Zeta. The most prominent feudal lords who did not recognize Balša's rule was the House of Crnojević, who were consistently encouraged by the Venetians to rebel against him.

Balša II needed four attempts to conquer Durrës, an important commercial and strategic centre. Defeated, Karl Thopia appealed to the Turks for help. Turkish forces led by Hajrudin Pasha inflicted heavy damage on Balša II's forces and killed him at a major Battle of Savra near Lushnjë, in 1385.

=== Đurađ II ===
The successor of Balša II, Đurađ II Stracimirović Balšić, ruled Zeta from 1385 to 1403; he was Balša's nephew and son of Stracimir. He also had difficulties controlling the local feudal lords, with no control over the fiefs of the entire Upper Zeta. In addition, the feudal lords around Onogošt (Nikšić) accepted the Venetian protection. The most prominent of those lords was Radič Crnojević, who controlled the area between Budva and Mount Lovćen. Moreover, several Albanian feudal lords, particularly Lekë Dukagjini and Paul Dukagjini joined the conspiracy against Đurađ II.

With this in mind as well as the constant danger from the Turks, Đurađ II maintained strong family ties with Serbia's main lord of the time, Prince Lazar. To help Prince Lazar defend the Serbian lands from Ottoman invasion, Đurađ II sent his troops along with Ban Tvrtko I Kotromanić's forces (with whom he had a dispute over Kotor) to meet the Ottoman army at Kosovo Polje. Despite Sultan Murad I's death, the Serbian army suffered a defeat at the epic Battle of Kosovo in 1389. According to the sources, Đurađ II did not participate in the battle, being in Ulcinj in Southern Zeta.

In later years, Đurađ II played skilful diplomatic games to enhance the rivalry between the Ottomans and the Venetians. To that purpose, he offered Shkodër to both hoping that eventually he would be able to keep it. After two years of fighting, Turks and Venetians agreed to leave it to Đurađ II, who was neutral in the conflict. Similarly, the rivalry between Venetians and Hungarians brought a benefit to him. After a serious defeat of his forces by Turks near Nicopolis, the Hungarian King Sigismund gave him the title of Prince of Albania and the control over the islands of Hvar and Korčula.

In the feud between Đurađ Branković and his uncle, Stefan Lazarević (son of Prince Lazar), who later received the title of Byzantine Despot, Đurađ II sided with Stefan. Due to Đurađ's support, Stefan defeated Turkish forces led by Đurađ Branković in the Battle of Tripolje on Kosovo Field in November 1402.

=== Balša III ===
In 1403, Đurađ II's 17-year-old son, Balša III, inherited the throne of Zeta after his father died as a consequence of the injuries he suffered in the Battle of Tripolje. As he was young and inexperienced, his main advisor was his mother Jelena, a sister of the Serbian ruler, Stefan Lazarević. Under her influence, Balša III declared Orthodox Christianity as the official state religion; however, Catholicism was tolerated.

Balša III continued the policies of his father. In 1418, took Shkodër from the Venetians, but lost Budva. In the following year, he made an unsuccessful attempt to recapture Budva. Afterwards, he went to Belgrade to ask for help from Despot Stefan, but never returned to Zeta.

== Aftermath ==
In 1421, before his death and under the influence of his mother Jelena, Balša III passed the rule of Zeta to Despot Stefan Lazarević. He fought Venetians and regained Bar in mid-1423, and in the following year he sent his nephew Đurađ Branković, who regaining Drivast and Ulcinium (Ulcinj).

== Sources ==
- Ćirković, Sima (2004). The Serbs. Malden: Blackwell Publishing. ISBN 9781405142915.
- Djukanovic, Bojka (2023). Historical Dictionary of Montenegro. Bloomsbury Publishing. ISBN 9781538139158.
- Elsie, Robert (2010). Historical Dictionary of Albania (PDF). Historical Dictionaries of Europe. Vol. 75 (2 ed.). Scarecrow Press. p. 255. ISBN 978-0810861886. Archived from the original (PDF) on 6 October 2014.
- Fajfrić, Željko (2000) [1998], Sveta loza Stefana Nemanje (in Serbian), Belgrade: "Tehnologije, izdavastvo, agencija Janus", "Rastko".
- Fine, John V. A. (1994) [1987]. The Late Medieval Balkans: A Critical Survey from the Late Twelfth Century to the Ottoman Conquest. Ann Arbor, Michigan: University of Michigan Press. ISBN 978-0-472-10079-8.
- Hosaflook, David (2012). "Appendix one: Shkodra's history in brief". In David Hosaflook (ed.). The Siege of Shkodra: Albania's Courageous Stand Against Ottoman Conquest, 1478. Translated by David Hosaflook. Onufri Publishing House. p. 245. ISBN 978-99956-87-77-9.
- J. Jovanović, Stvaranje Crnogorske Države i Razvoj Crnogorske Nacionalnosti, 1947, Cetinje pages 18, 28, 36, 43, and 54-55.
- Orbini, Mauro (1601). Il Regno de gli Slavi hoggi corrottamente detti Schiavoni. Pesaro: Apresso Girolamo Concordia.
- Орбин, Мавро (1968). Краљевство Словена. Београд: Српска књижевна задруга.
- Rojas Molina, Grabiela (2022). Decoding Debate in the Venetian Senate: Short Stories of Crisis and Response on Albania (1392-1402). The Medieval Mediterranean. Vol. 134. BRILL. ISBN 9789004520936.
- D. Živković, Istorija Crnogorskog Naroda, 1989, Cetinje.
