= Stefan Lazarević =

14/15th-century Serbian despot and saint

Saint Stefan Lazarević Стефан Лазаревић
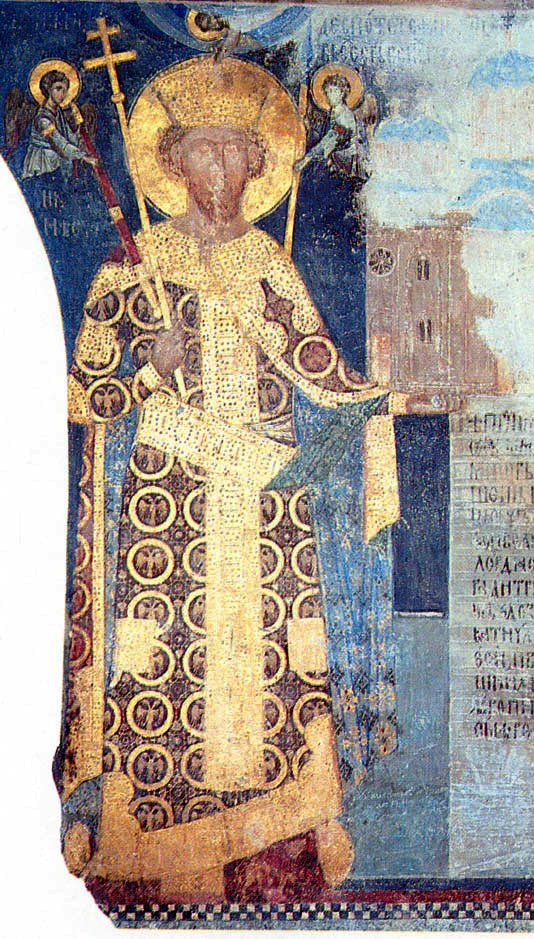
- Fresco of Stefan Lazarević from Manasija monastery

Ktetor Stefan the Tall
- Venerated in: Eastern Orthodox Church
- Canonized: 1 August 1927 by Eastern Orthodox Church
- Feast: 1 August (O.S. 19 July)
- Attributes: Church builder

Despot of Serbia
- Reign: 1402–1427
- Predecessor: Himself as Prince of Serbia
- Successor: Đurađ Branković

Prince of Serbia
- Reign: 1389–1402
- Predecessor: Lazar of Serbia
- Successor: Himself as Despot of Serbia
- Born: c. 1377; Kruševac, Moravian Serbia
- Died: 19 July 1427; Glava, Serbian Despotate
- Burial: Manasija Monastery
- House: Lazarević
- Father: Lazar of Serbia
- Mother: Princess Milica of Serbia
- Religion: Serbian Orthodox
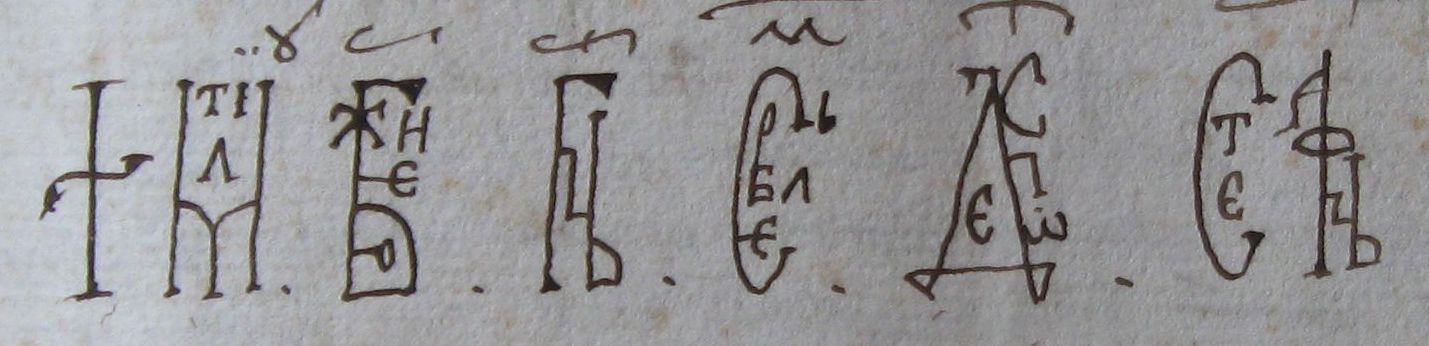
- Signature

Stefan Lazarević (Serbian Cyrillic: Стефан Лазаревић; c. 1377 – 19 July 1427), also known as Stefan the Tall (Serbian: Стефан Високи, romanized: Stefan Visoki), ruled as a Serbian prince (1389–1402) and despot (1402–1427). He was also a diplomat, legislator, ktetor, patron of the arts, poet, and one of the founding members of the Order of the Dragon. The son of Prince Lazar Hrebeljanović, he was regarded as one of the finest knights and military leaders of his time. After the death of his father in the Battle of Kosovo, he became ruler of Moravian Serbia and ruled with his mother, Milica (a Nemanjić), until he reached adulthood in 1393. Stefan led troops in several battles as an Ottoman vassal, until asserting independence after receiving the title of despot from the Byzantine Empire in 1402.

Becoming a Hungarian ally in 1403–04, he received possessions, such as Belgrade and the Golubac Fortress. He also held a superior rank in the Order of the Dragon. During his reign, he had a conflict with his nephew, Đurađ Branković, which ended in 1412. Lazarević also inherited Zeta and waged war against Venice. Since he was childless, he designated his nephew Đurađ as heir in 1426, a year before his death.

On the domestic front, he broke the resistance of the Serbian nobles and used the periods of peace to strengthen Serbia politically, economically, culturally, and militarily. In 1412, he issued the Code of Mines, with a section on governing Novo Brdo – the largest mine in the Balkans at the time. The code increased the development of mining in Serbia, which was the economic backbone of the Serbian Despotate. At the time of his death, Serbia was one of the largest silver producers in Europe. In the field of architecture, he continued the development of the Morava school. His reign and personal literary works are sometimes associated with early signs of the Renaissance in the Serbian lands. He introduced knightly tournaments, modern battle tactics, and firearms to Serbia. He was a great patron of the arts and culture by providing shelter and support to scholars and refugees from neighboring countries that had been taken by the Ottomans. In addition, he was himself a writer, his most notable work being A Homage to Love, which is characterized by Renaissance themes. During his reign, the Resava School of arts was formed.

On 1 August 1927, the 500th anniversary of his death, he was canonized by the Serbian Orthodox Church as Saint Despot Stefan of Serbia, and his relics are kept in the Koporin Monastery.

== Background and family ==
Stefan was the son of Lazar, the prince of Moravian Serbia, and his wife, Milica, who was a member of a collateral branch of the Nemanjić dynasty. Milica's father, Prince Vratko, was a direct descendant of Vukan, the eldest son of Stefan Nemanja. In addition to Stefan, they had seven other children.

=== Marriage ===
On 12 September 1405, Stefan married Helena Gattilusio, the daughter of Francesco II of Lesbos. According to Konstantin the Philosopher, Stefan first saw his wife in Lesbos, where Francesco II offered him a choice among his daughters; the marriage was arranged "with the advice and participation" of Helena's sister, Empress Eirene. There is no mention of Helena after her marriage to Stefan; this led British historian Anthony Luttrell to remark that "apparently there were never any children; nothing is known of her death or burial; and, most unusually, she did not appear in any of the post-1402 fresco portraits of Stefan". Luttrell concludes, "Maybe she was too young for the marriage to be consummated, and perhaps she stayed on Lesbos and never traveled to Serbia; possibly she died soon after her marriage."

Stefan's brothers and sisters
Stefan's brothers
Name	Lifespan	Title
Dobrovoj	(Died as a child)	
Vuk	(c. 1380–1410)	prince
Stefan's sisters
Name	Lifespan	Marriages
Мara	(?–1426)	Vuk Branković, c. 1371
Jelena	(1365/1366–1443)	1.Đurađ II Stracimirović Balšić (1385–1403), c. 1386; 2.Sandalj Hranić (1392–1435), 1411
Dragana	(1371–1395)	Ivan (1371–1395) or his son Alexander, c. 1386
Teodora (Jelena)	(?–before 1405)	Nikola II Gorjanski, c. 1387
Olivera	(c. 1378 – after 1443/1444)	Bayezid I (1389–1403), 1390

== Prince ==
=== Early years and rise to the throne ===
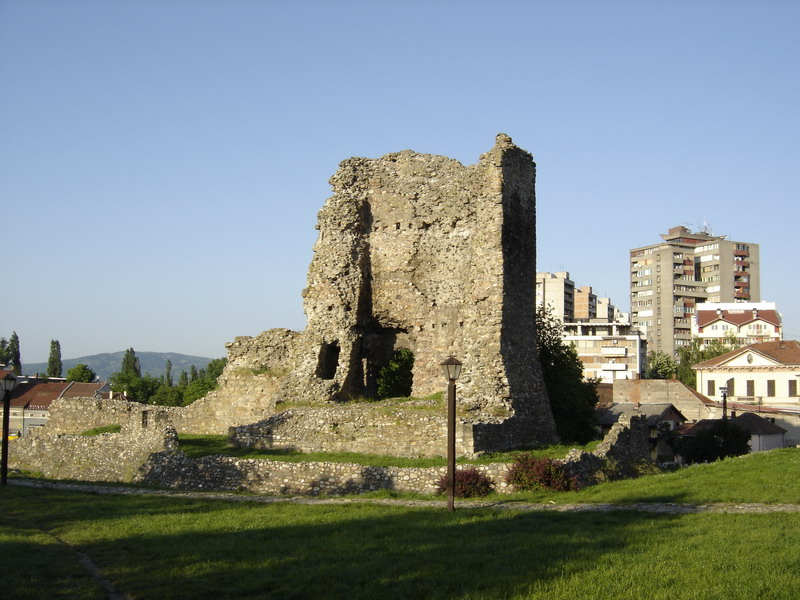
Remains of Donjon Tower of the Kruševac Fortress, the capital of the lands of the House of Lazarević, where Prince Stefan Lazarević was born.

Stefan Lazarević was born c. 1377 in Kruševac, Serbia. After his father was killed in the Battle of Kosovo on 15 June 1389, Stefan became the new Serbian prince; before he became of age, the state was ruled by his mother, Princess Milica.

Stefan's succession came about at an especially poor time for the state of Lazarević, which found itself surrounded by powerful neighbors. On one side was Bayezid I, who withdrew after the Battle of Kosovo to consolidate his power among the Ottomans, and on the other was Vuk Branković, the husband of Stefan's sister Mara, who became the most powerful of Serbian aristocrats after the battle. The neighbor to the west was Bosnian king Tvrtko I (1353–1377 ban, king 1377–1391), who was considered the legitimate successor of the Nemanjić crown, and he portrayed the Battle of Kosovo as his own victory over the Ottomans, while their possessions in the north bordered Hungary, ruled by King Sigismund.

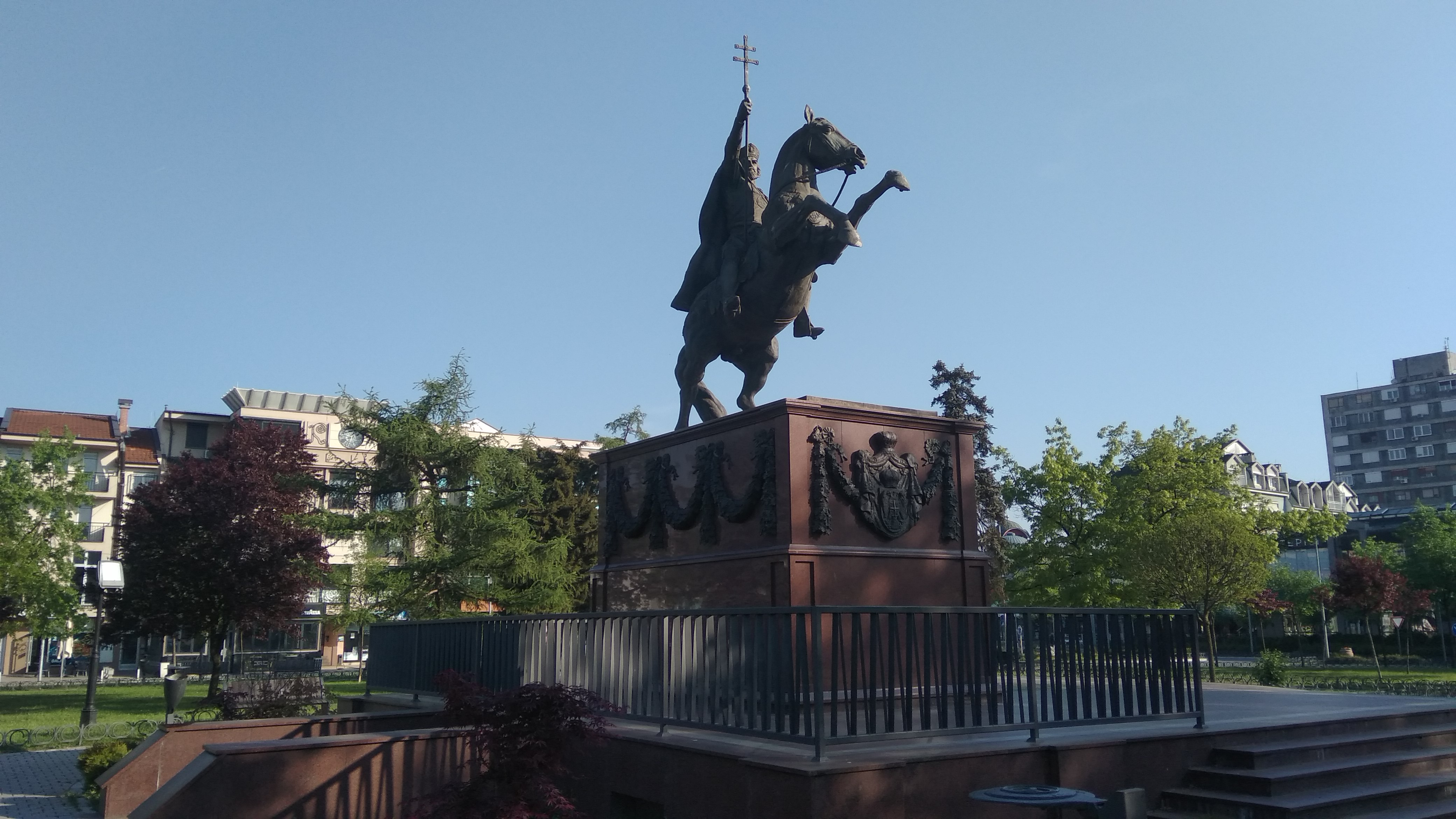
Monument to Stefan Lazarević in Kruševac

On 7 July, three weeks after the Battle of Kosovo, Sigismund sent his palatine, Nicholas II Garay, to negotiate with Vuk Branković about things that were in his and the Serbians favor, where he confirmed in advance any agreements that they had made. Although both Nicholas and Vuk were married to sisters of Stefan, it was not uncommon at the time that strong neighbors, even relatives, to oppose legitimate, but juvenile, heirs to the throne. The outcome of these negotiations is not known, but already in the fall, Sigismund began an offensive against the young Serbian prince Stefan. His forces crossed the Sava River in October, and in early November, they occupied the fortresses of Borač and Čestin near present-day Kragujevac. In these circumstances, Milica, along with the state assembly, with the support of Serbian Patriarch Spyridon (1379–1389), decided on the conclusion of peace and acceptance of the supremacy of the sultan Bayezid I. Details this decision are not well known, but peace was certainly made before Patriarch Spirydon's death on 18 August 1389.

According to the terms of the peace, Prince Stefan pledged to send extra squads to the Ottoman sultan and pay tribute, and that he and his brother, Vuk Lazarević, had to appear annually at the Sultan's palace to confirm their allegiance. In addition, Bayezid I married the youngest daughter of Prince Lazar and Princess Milica, Olivera, and Vuk and Stefan had to personally take her to Sultan Bayezid in Bursa. The effects of this peace deal were immediately visible; already in summer 1390, Serbian forces reinforced with extra Ottoman detachments recaptured the lost cities. Stefan militarily supported various Ottoman campaigns, and in return, Bayazid I supported Stefan against his opponents and his restoration of Serbia, which would become a relatively strong state.

There is nothing on the activities of Vuk Branković during this period. It is certain that after the Battle of Kosovo, he sought to expand his domain (he had conquered part of Polimlje), and that he used the same title that was used by his father (Lord of Serbs and Podunavije). However, by early May 1390, Vuk felt threatened by Stefan, and he asked the Republic of Ragusa to facilitate his safety if it came to a conflict. There is no evidence of direct hostility between Stefan and Vuk, and the two families kept an uneasy peace during this period. Conflict at the Serbian-Hungarian border continued over the next two years. In the summer of 1392, Sigismund crossed near Kovin and marched to Ždrelo, then retreated and tried to take Golubac. At the same time, the land of Vuk Branković were under Ottoman attack. In early 1392, the Ottomans occupied Skoplje and continued marching north, forcing Vuk to make peace with Bayezid and become his vassal by the end of the year.

=== Battles of Rovine and of Nicopolis ===
In 1393, Stefan became an adult and took full possession of the throne. Milica became a nun and withdrew to her endowment, the monastery Ljubostinja. That same year, Bayezid I dealt with Bulgarian vassals for their alleged links with the Hungarian King Sigismund. Veliko Tarnovo was besieged, and Bulgaria was devastated; the Bulgarian ruler Ivan Shishman was Stefan's brother-in-law. After this, many Bulgarian scholars sought refuge in neighboring Christian countries, among which was Serbia.

During the autumn of 1394, Bayezid began gathering forces for a campaign against Mircea I of Wallachia, where Stefan personally led the largest Serbian heavy cavalry squadron, while Serbian nobles Marko, Konstantin Dejanović, and Konstantin Balšić led their own forces. Bayezid's army crossed the Danube, and the Battle of Rovine took place on 17 May 1395, near present-day Pitești, resulting in a Wallachian victory. In the battle, Marko and Konstantin were killed, and Bayezid annexed their lands, largely to boost his economy. According to Constantine the Philosopher in his Life of Stefan Lazarević, before the battle, Marko said to Konstantin: "I pray God to help the Christians and that I will be among the first dead in this war."

The Ottoman forces then took Vidin, and, reinforced by Serbian detachments, marched into Banat during the summer of 1396, after attacking the lands of Vuk Branković and conquering a large part of it, including Priština.

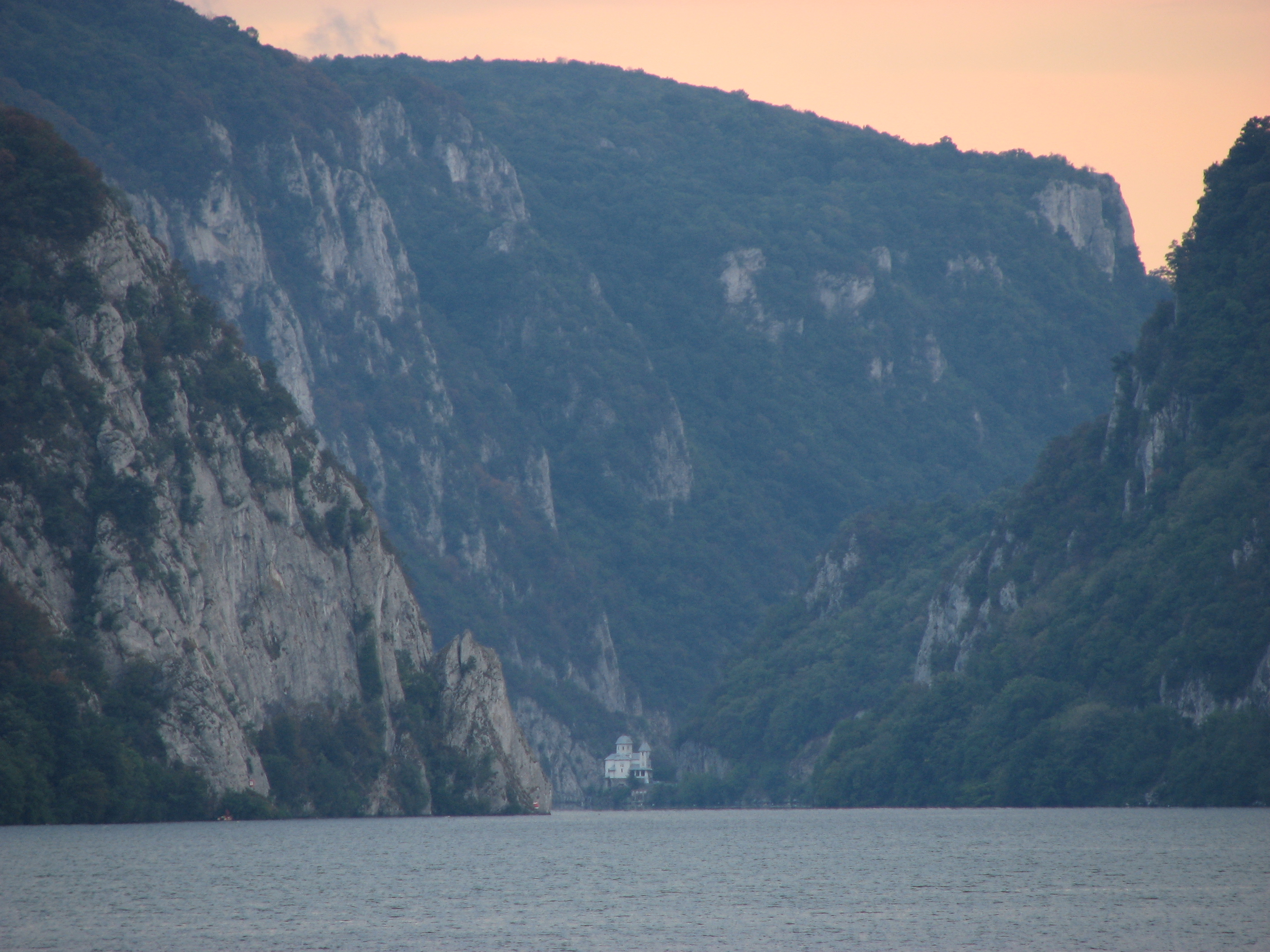
Iron Gates

The Wallachian victory at Rovine sparked a crusade in which forces from France, Burgundy, Germany, and other European countries joined the Hungarian king Sigismund and Mircea I, with the Venetian fleet, which was to enter the Danube from the Black Sea and support the army on the mainland. The crusader forces gathered in Hungary, after which they crossed the Danube and took Vidin. After that, the march continued down the Danube. Nicopolis, which had a large Ottoman garrison, was besieged. The siege broke the blockade of Constantinople, forcing Bayezid to send troops towards the Danube, joining forces with Stefan Lazarević's heavy cavalry near Plovdiv. A great battle took place on 25 September 1396 in which the Crusader forces were destroyed. Although numerically superior, the Crusader army lacked a joint command and thus was poorly coordinated on the battlefield. Also, they were ignorant of the Ottoman army's methods. After an initial Crusader success, the Ottomans initiated a counterattack that ended with the entry of the Hungarian knights into the battle. In this turning point of the battle, the Serbian heavy cavalry, led by Stefan Lazarević himself, broke through the Hungarian lines and surrounded King Sigismund, attacking the Hungarian banner troops of Nicholas II Garay. Garay's troops were dispersed, which had a decisive effect, because some of the Crusaders thought that Sigismund had been killed and that the battle was lost, while the Hungarian commanders convinced Sigismund that the battle was practically lost and that it was better to withdraw. After that, the Crusader lines fell apart, and a carnage ensued. One of the participants in the battle, Johann Schiltberger, described the Serbian attack:

When all of (Turkish) warriors were killed, King was attacked by another unit consisting of cavalry. When the Turkish sultan saw king's attack, he was about to flee the battlefield, but the Duke of Rascia (Serbia), known as the despot, seeing this, rushed to help the Turkish sultan, with 15,000 people and many other knights, and his men crushed king's banner and broke it.

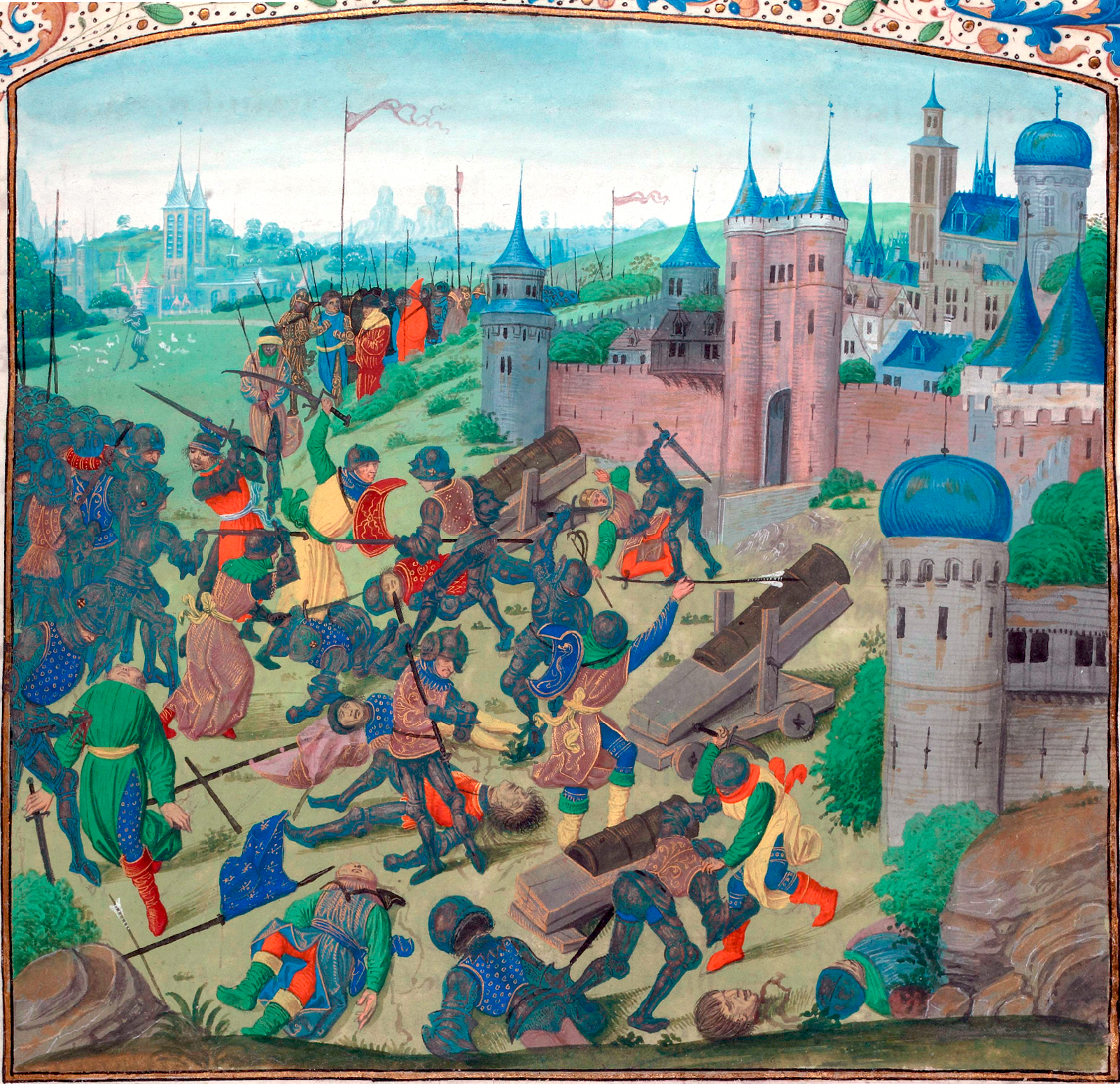
Battle of Nikopolis (pictured by Jean Froissart by 1398)

According to some, Serbian forces were hidden in a grove on the left wing of Bayezid's forces, making possible a sudden attack on the Hungarians, probably on their flank. A significant part was played by Stephen II Lackfi and Mircea I, who withdrew their forces from the battlefield just before Stefan's attack, leaving Sigismund without support. They had possibly connived with Stefan before the battle. Sigismund managed to escape on a fisherman's boat to the Venetian ships on the Danube. It is possible that Stefan purposely left enough time for Sigismund to board the boat; Stefan saving Sigismund may be one of the causes of Stefan's later induction into the Order of the Dragon, as the first and foremost.

There were disastrous consequences for the Balkan Christians after the defeat at the Battle of Nicopolis. Vidin was destroyed, Athens was occupied (1397), the Despotate of Morea was devastated once again, the fall of Constantinople became practically inevitable, and the land of Vuk Branković was taken by the Ottomans. Vuk Branković was captured and soon died in captivity (1397). Most of his area was transferred to the control of Stefan Lazarević, a small portion (centered in Vučitrn) was left to Branković's wife Mara and his sons (Đurađ, Grgur, and Lazar), while the Ottomans retained strategic locations under their direct rule. In addition, the Ottoman forces marched into Hungary and plundered its southern parts, especially Zemun and Dmitrovica.

=== Ottoman incursion into Bosnia ===
In January 1398, the Ottomans continued the offensive in the Balkans and attacked the Bosnian Kingdom. The leader of the campaign was one of Bayezid's sons, Musa Çelebi, with Prince Stefan attached to him with a smaller force. This campaign, besides looting Bosnia, did not achieve any success. The biggest culprit, according to Stefan's biographer, was a very bad winter.

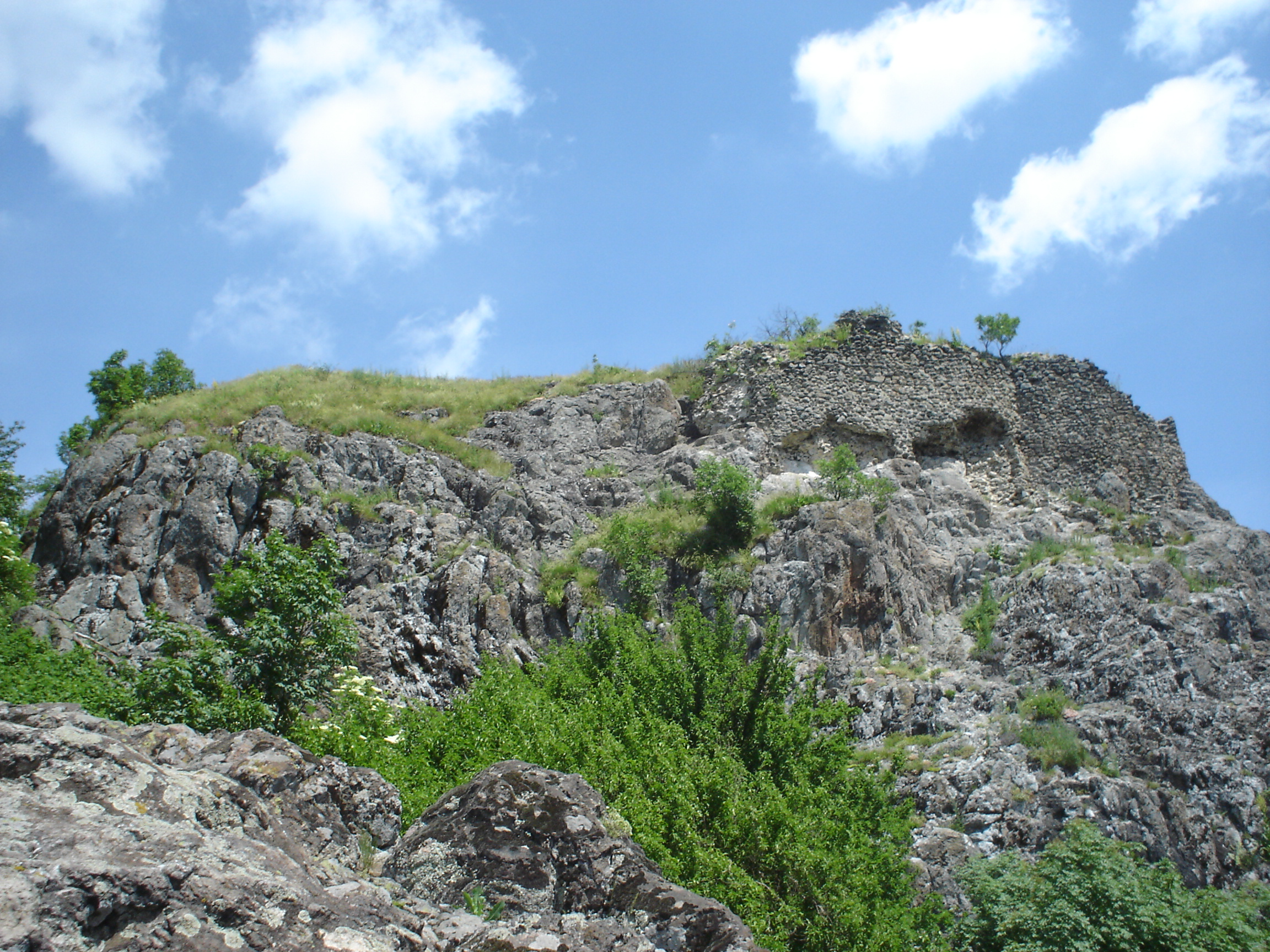
Ruins of the fortress of Ostrvica

A faction of the nobility tried to take advantage of Stefan's campaign to oust him from his throne. The faction leaders, dukes Novak Belocrkvić and Nikola Zojić, sought military aid from Voivode Mihajlo and, to the sultan, tried to blame the failure of the Bosnian campaign on Stefan's connections with Sigismund. The exact course of further events is not precisely known, but it is evident that Stefan knew of the plot, being informed of it via Mihajlo. Duke Nikola was assassinated. Seeing that, Duke Novak took monastic vows and ceded his lands to Stefan, saving his life.

It is certain that their allegations reached Bayezid, and in the second half of March, the Ottoman forces marched into Serbia. It is not known what they did in Serbia; there is no evidence of the invasion of any of the neighboring countries. In that spring, Stefan first sent his mother (now known as nun Eugenia), along with nun Jefimija, to Edirne to plead his case with the sultan; they returned before 23 May and had managed to ensure that Stefan was received by Bayezid to justify himself. In addition, they brought from Bursa the relics of St. Petka, which were most likely placed in the castle church in Kruševac, Lazarica. Then Stefan went to Edirne himself. Both mother and son were received generously by Bayezid, and the situation was resolved. Bayezid is reported to have held Stefan in high esteem, bestowing upon him a respect which he was not accustomed to give to his Christian vassals, or even his own sons:

I think of you as my eldest and favourite son, who stands before me in such honour as you? I am already growing old, and soon will die perhaps in battle or of illness – and then your time will come.

— Bayezid to Stefan

=== Battle of Ankara ===
The relationship between Prince Stefan and the Branković family over the years is not known from historical sources. It is known that the Brankovićs were able, with the money that Vuk Branković left to guard the Kotor and the Republic of Ragusa, to recover some of their former lands. In early 1402, their land included parts of Kosovo, Polimlje, Sjenica, and Brskovo, and since the spring of that year, they became Bayezid's vassals, with the same responsibilities Prince Stefan had. Beyond their control remained Zvečan, Jeleč, and Gluhavica, which were held by the Ottomans, and Priština, which we know from March of the same year was part of the lands of Stefan Lazarević.

Great changes in Asia Minor and Southeastern Europe were caused by an invasion of the Tatars under the leadership of Tamerlane. His invasion of Asia Minor forced Bayezid I to gather his forces and confront him in battle, which took place on 28 July 1402, near Angora (Ankara). In this battle, Ottoman forces suffered defeat, Bayezid I and one of his sons, Musa Çelebi, were captured, and the following year Bayezid died in captivity. One of the main reasons for the Ottoman defeat was the desertion of Turkic and Tartar cavalry from Anatolia, which, before the beginning of the battle, defected to Timur's side, unhappy with Bayezid's rule and having a sense of camaraderie with the forces of Timur. This allowed Timur's forces to break Bayezid's left wing and encircle his center, where the Sultan was located with his janissaries (around 10,000). On the right wing, there were Bayezid's vassals, among whom were Đurađ Branković and his brother Grgur, Stefan's brother Vuk, and Stefan himself, who was also a commander of the right wing. He fought bravely, which Timur admired. Stefan and his knights—who, according to chronicler Duka and several contemporaries, consisted of 5,000 heavily armed men with spears, including cavalry—repeatedly attacked the enemy lines to rescue Bayezid from hostile forces. Stefan eventually succeeded, but Bayezid refused to withdraw. Stefan then took Bayezid's son Süleyman Çelebi and started to retreat towards Bursa under constant attack from the Tatars. Byzantine chronicler Laonikos Chalkokondyles states that "the Serbs fought as real heroes, each worthy of praise", adding that "They attacked Tatars with great vigor, crushing them hard in the fight". About the Serbian struggle, there is an evidentiary toponym Srb-ghazi – Serbian winner, near Ankara. During the fight, Prince Stefan was wounded, while Gregory Branković was captured and later released. In the meantime, Bayezid was captured with his son Musa, and his harem, where Stefan's sister,Olivera, was.

One of the reasons Stefan honored his vassal obligations to Bayezid was the desire to keep the Serbian-Ottoman Alliance strong under looming Hungarian pressure. Another was that Stefan's sister, Olivera, was married to the Sultan. She was captured in the battle and later released through an agreement that was signed between Stefan and Timur. It seems that a ransom was not paid, thanks to the great respect that Timur had for Stefan. She returned to Serbia in spring 1403, and a little later she settled permanently in Stefan's castle, in Belgrade. A group of imprisoned Serbs was taken to Samarkand, where they were employed on construction works. On the other hand, Timur's forces had already left Asia Minor in 1403, and Timur himself died in early 1405, during his expedition to China. In the Ottoman Empire, Bayezid's capture and then his death brought on a civil war between his sons for the throne, a war known as the Ottoman Interregnum.

=== Stay at Constantinople ===
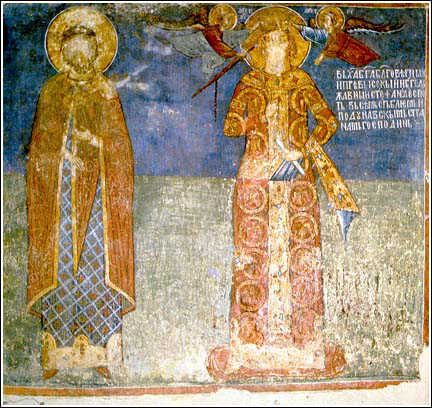
Vuk and Stefan (Fresco from Ljubostinja monastery 1402 – 1405)

From Bursa, Stefan and his brother Vuk Lazarević went to Constantinople, which had been relieved after several years of Ottoman blockade. In August 1402, John VII Palaiologos (who ruled in place of his absent uncle, Emperor Manuel II Palaiologos) awarded Stefan the high Byzantine title of Despot, which in the Byzantine hierarchy was just beneath imperial rank. In addition, Stefan was betrothed to Helen Gattilusio, the daughter of Genoese master of Lesbos Francesco II Gattilusio.

While the Lazarević brothers were in Constantinople, the Branković family was hatching a scheme against them. Đurađ Branković was imprisoned at the city dungeon on his return to Constantinople. The reason for this is unknown, and many later chroniclers, such as Mavro Orbini, claim that Đurađ was planning to join Bayezid I's son Süleyman, who established his rule in the European part of the Ottoman Empire. This is probably true, as Đurađ, after escaping from prison in September, went to Süleyman and asked him for military aid against Lazarević.

Stefan's return to Serbia was thwarted due to Ottoman hostility; part of the returning Serbian troops were killed on their way home, near Adrianople. The two brothers and about 260 remaining soldiers embarked for Serbia, with a short stay in Lesbos. Their first stop was Zeta, ruled by Đurađ II Balšić, the husband of Stefan's sister Jelena Lazarević. Đurađ II received them at his capital in Ulcinj, after which Stefan began organizing the army for a confrontation with the Branković. Stefan's mother gathered an army in Serbia, while at the same time Branković and Ottoman troops took control of roads around Kosovo to prevent the return of Stefan.

== Despot Stefan Lazarević ==
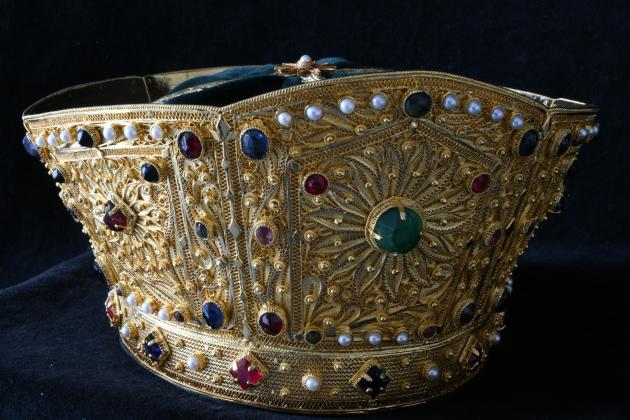
Reconstructed crown of Despot Stefan Lazarević

=== Battle of Tripolje ===
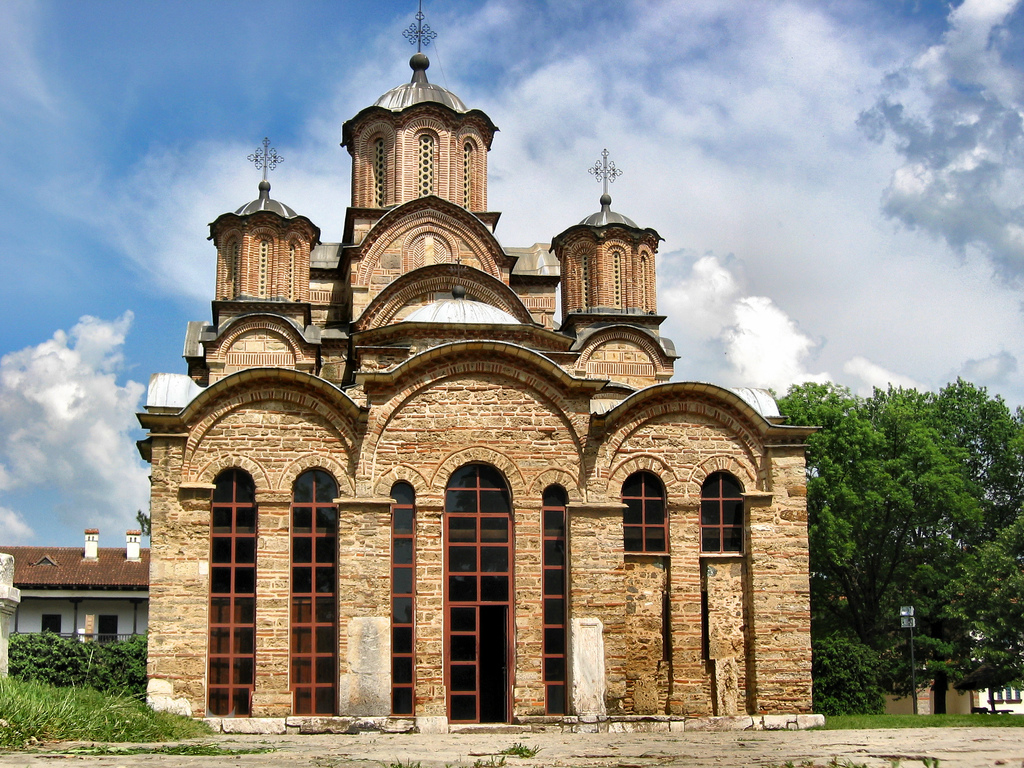
Gračanica monastery built in 1321 by King Stephen Uroš II Milutin of Serbia.

In late October, Stefan's army marched from Stari Bar across Balšić's Zeta, some Venetian holdings, and then through Skadar to Kosovo. Avoiding the main roads controlled by Đurađ Branković and his allies, Stefan's forces arrived at Gračanica on 21 November near Tripolje. In the following battle, the forces of Branković, strengthened by Ottoman detachments, were defeated.

Stefan divided his army in two, following orders sent by his mother, before the battle, and his opponents did the same. Most of the troops were placed under the command of his brother Vuk, who directed them against the forces commanded by Đurađ Branković, while Stefan, with a smaller force, attacked the Ottomans. Stefan was victorious, but largely due to the desertion of Uglješa Vlatković from the Ottoman side. Vlatković was an Ottoman vassal (holding the former lands of Dejanović), but he showed the Ottoman war plans to Stefan and during the battle joined Stefan's ranks. As a reward, Stefan gave Vlatković Vranje, Inogoštem, and Preševo, which had previously belonged to Vlatković's father. The Lazarević brothers then went to Novo Brdo, and came into a verbal dispute. The despot's younger brother was criticized for ignoring war casualties and his weak leadership, because the bulk of the forces Vuk led were badly maimed by Đurađ Branković's troops.

Victory in the Battle of Tripolje enabled Stefan to regain his throne and influence in Serbia, which was further strengthened in the coming years. However, the fight with Branković had not ended, and in a sense, was further complicated by the conflict that arose between Stefan and Vuk. His younger brother, in the summer of 1403, left Serbia and headed to Süleyman to ask him for help in forcing his older brother to cede part of the state administration. He was told to stop by their mother, who followed him, and seemingly managed to reconcile the brothers.

In 1403, Süleyman was in Gallipoli negotiating with several Christian states (Byzantium, Genoa, Venice, the Knights Hospitaller, and Naxos) in the Balkans to secure an agreement with them and start an offensive against his brothers in Asia Minor. The terms of the agreement were that Byzantium was to cease being a vassal of the Ottomans, while regaining Thessaloniki and several cities on the coast of the Bosphorus and the Black Sea. One of the provisions of this contract referred to Stefan, although he probably did not take part in its making. Stefan kept his former possessions but still had to pay tribute and send the Sultan military support, although he was not obliged to lead such forces himself.

=== Alliance with Sigismund ===
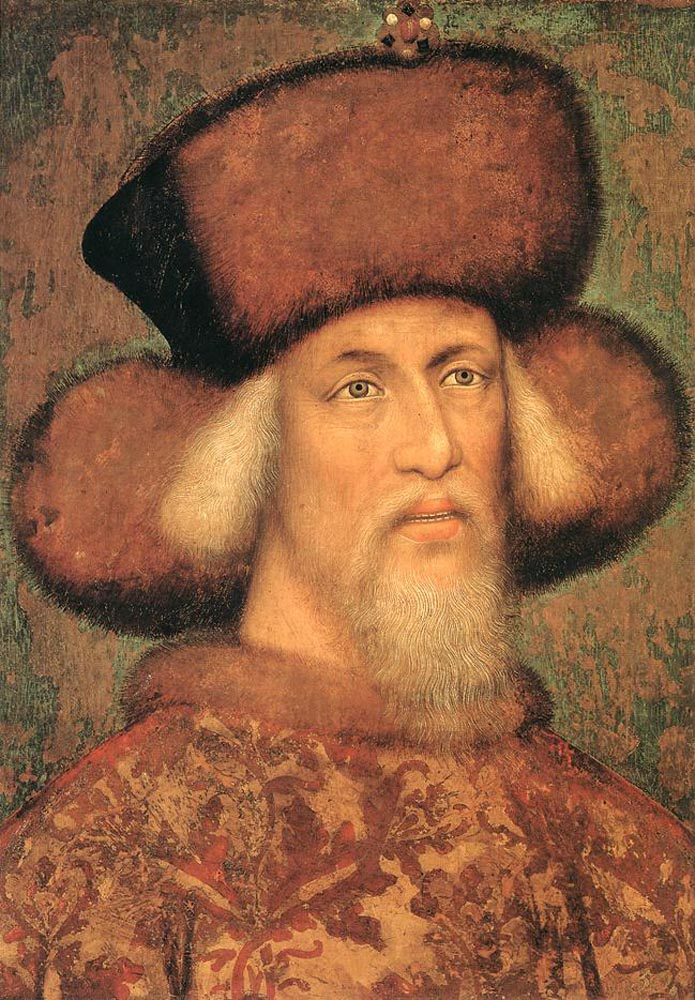
Sigismund of Hungary – Antonio Pissanelo 1433

The changed conditions in Southeast Europe in the early fifteenth century led to a convergence of interests of Despot Stefan and Hungarian king Sigismund. Stefan needed a strong ally who could help him get rid of Ottoman domination, and also allow him to stay on the throne of Serbia, due to the conflict with Đurađ Branković, who enjoyed the support of Süleyman. On the other hand, the Kingdom of Hungary was in a deep internal crisis, and, until 1403, Sigismund was unable to return to the country and regain complete control. It was, therefore, necessary for him to rely on a secure southern border while simultaneously trying to provide a strong base for the resistance against the Ottomans and eventually expand to the south.

The negotiations were most likely initiated by King Sigismund, as he sent emissaries to Stefan, among whom was his close associate of Florentine origin, Filippo Scolari. The objective of this delegation was successful and led to the conclusion of an agreement between the two rulers in late 1403 or early 1404. Under its provisions, Stefan accepted being Sigismund's vassal and received from him Mačva and Belgrade. With these new lands, including the Golubac Fortress, Stefan strengthened his northern border, now delineated by the Sava and Danube rivers.

=== Settling the situation in Serbia and clashes in Zeta ===
Emboldened by his new Hungarian alliance, Stefan attacked the lands of Branković around the river Sitnica, and then began to attack the areas under Ottoman control, in which he might have had Hungarian military support as well. It is not known exactly from which cities and regions they were taken, but they were likely in the south-eastern part of Serbia. After these successes, he was able to make a peace deal with Branković, and at the same time, through his mother's influence, not have Süleyman involved in retribution.

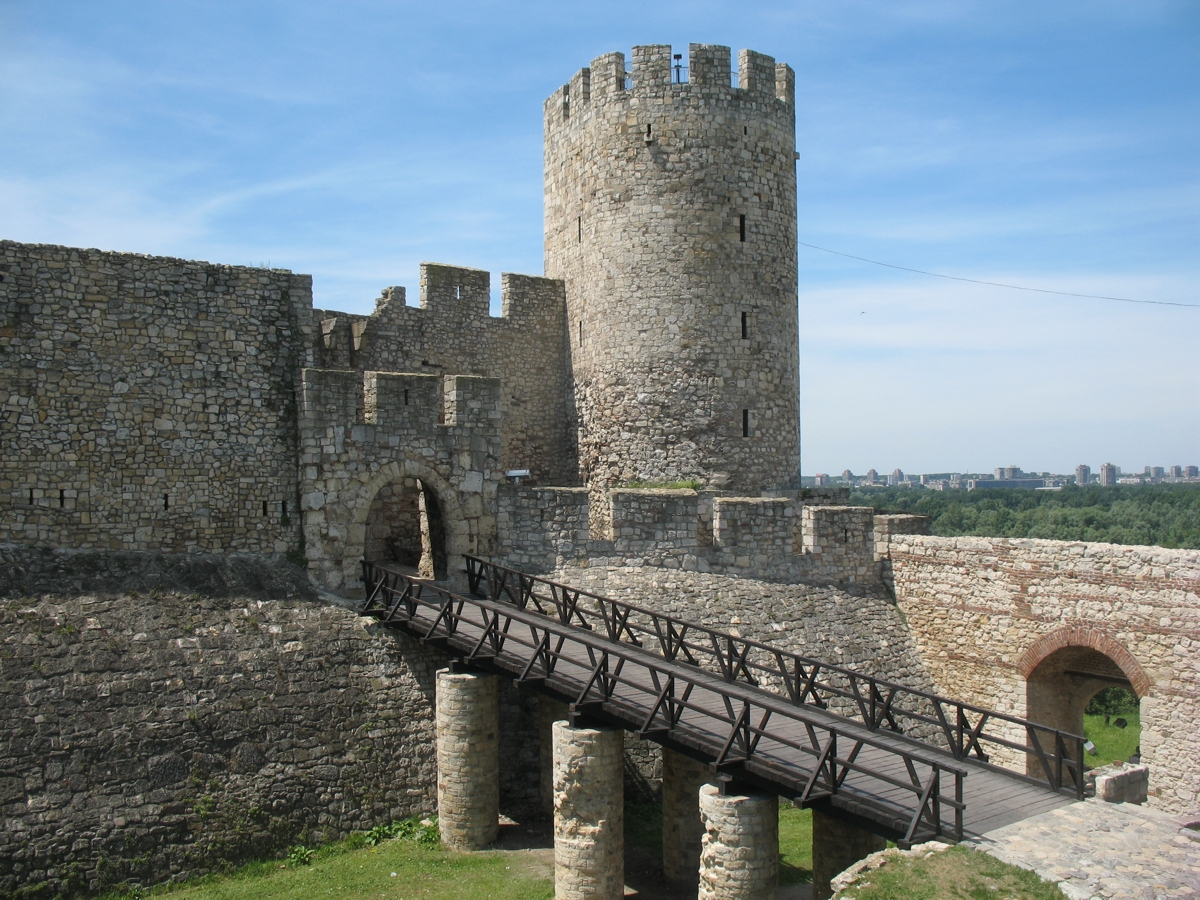
Part of Belgrade Fortress from the time of Despot Stefan

Immediately after taking of Belgrade, Stefan started the reconstruction of its fortifications, which were destroyed by the Ottomans in 1397. In addition, he began work on the all-around development of the city, which was completed by the end of his reign. In the beginning of 1405, Stefan made Belgrade the capital of Serbia, which until then had been Kruševac. His mother Milica's death was a major blow to the Despotate's diplomacy with various Serbian and Ottoman lords. Nevertheless, the situation in the Despotate stabilized as the state started to grow in prosperity, evidenced by the charter for Borač, issued from Dubrovnik (Republic of Ragusa). Stefan negotiated with Ragusa during the year and managed to reinstate many commercial pacts Ragusa had with previous Serbian autocrats.

At the beginning of 1405, a rebellion against Venetian rule broke out among the local population in Skadar. The reason for it lay in the high-handed fashion of Venetian policies in the region, which were manifested by impounding properties, which were then shared with Venetian supporters, denying the rights of Orthodox churches in the area under the authority of Venice. Stefan's brother-in-law, the deceased Đurađ II, had set some of this in motion, as he had felt it necessary to be on good terms with Venice, and had sold it cities such as Skadar. His widow, Jelena Lazarević (Stefan's oldest sister), who was a shrewd statesman and scholar, did not like Đurađ II's politics, so she managed to influence her son, Balša III, to start asking for rights for Orthodox monasteries, which triggered the First Scutari War. As Balša had no significant support, he turned to Stefan, thus bringing Zeta under Serbia's influence once again. Stefan was not able to involve himself directly in this conflict, though he did serve as mediator on a few occasions. A peace treaty was signed in 1408, but this peace would be temporarily broken several times in the following decade, leading to a continuing struggle for Pomorje.

=== Order of the Dragon ===
Coat of arms of Despot Stefan

In December 1408, Hungarian King Sigismund founded the Order of the Dragon. In the founding charter of 1408, Stefan Lazarević is the first knight named, as Stephanus Despoth, dominus Serbiae.

=== The rebellion of brother Vuk ===
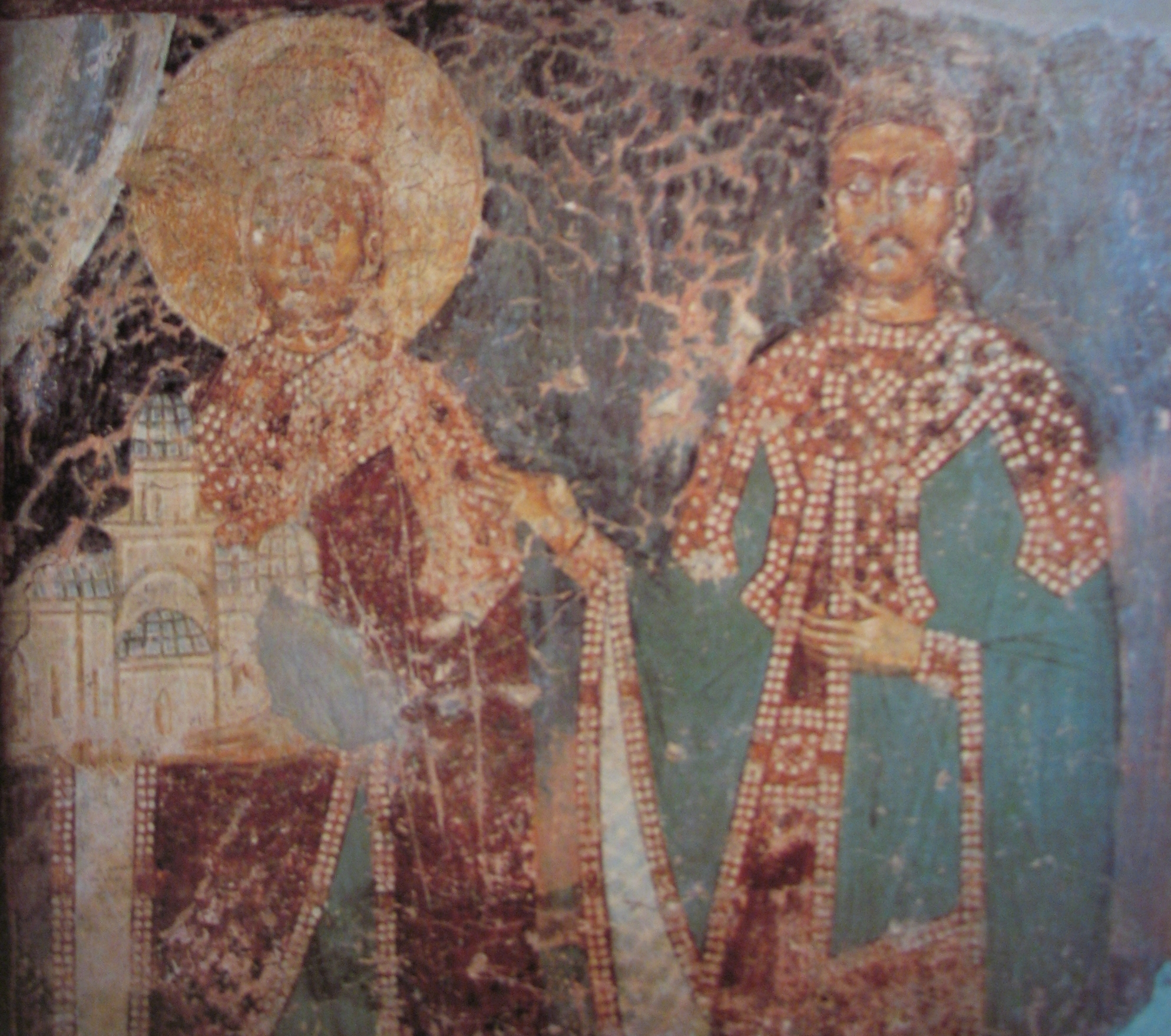
Stefan and Vuk (Fresco from monastery Rudenica 1402 – 1405)

By late 1408, Stefan and Vuk seemed to have restarted their rivalry, and with their mother Milica's death a few years earlier, conflict seemed more certain than ever. Stefan rejected Vuk's demand for his land. In turn, Vuk went to Süleyman's court and asked him for military assistance against Stefan, recognizing Süleyman's suzerainty in advance.

In the beginning of 1409, Vuk marched into Stefan's lands with an overwhelming force of Ottoman troops. Though the amount of support Vuk got from Süleyman was a surprise, the quick reaction of Stefan's ally Philip de Skolarisa indicates that Stefan and Sigismund were aware of Vuk's plans beforehand. Most of the conflict took place in Kosovo. Priština especially suffered during this war, as attested by the many letters that arrived in Dubrovnik from its citizens. Ragusans were instructed to declare neutrality and approach the situation diplomatically, though they were also encouraged not to harm any of Stefan's men, and actively partake in fortress defense efforts.

By the summer of 1409, Stefan was forced to retreat to well-fortified Belgrade, refusing submission to Süleyman, but being forced to deal with Vuk. The two negotiated, and thus, practically, Stefan ceded the southeastern part of his lands to Vuk (south of the West Morava River). Vuk ruled these lands on his own, while being an Ottoman vassal – just like Đurađ Branković to his west.

=== Civil war between Musa and Süleyman ===
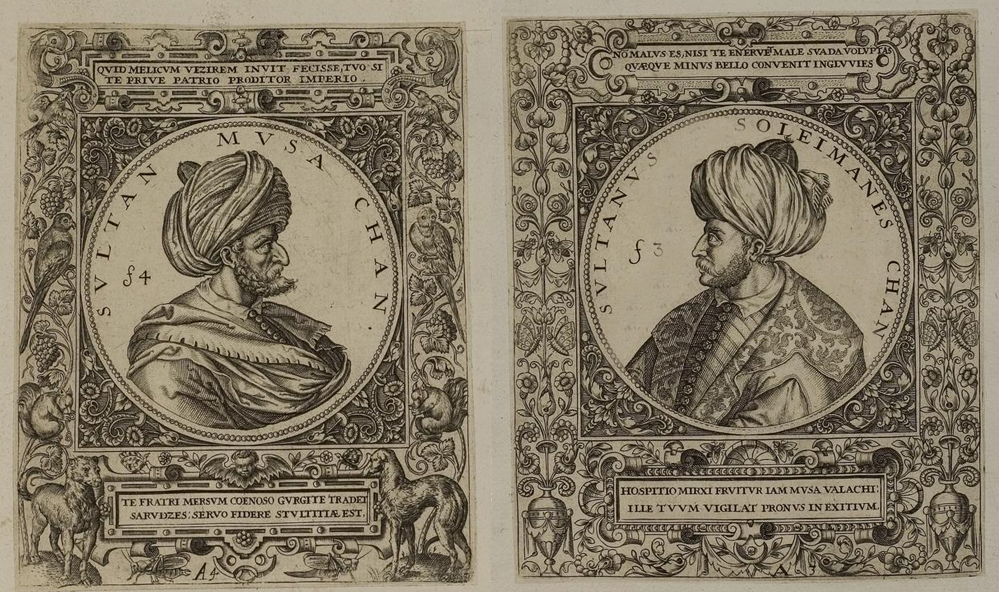
Late 16th-century depiction of Musa and Süleyman, facing each other.

As both were in conflict with Süleyman, Stefan and Musa Çelebi became natural allies, and formalized an alliance. Süleyman's absence from Rumelia triggered a swift offensive by Musa and his ally Stefan, who captured Gallipoli and defeated Beglerbey Sinan at Yambol, Süleyman's seat. These victories enabled Musa to also ally with Stefan's Serbian opponents—Đurađ Branković and his own brother Vuk.

These events led Süleyman to return to Rumelia. He was supported by the Byzantine Emperor Manuel II Palaiologos, who helped Süleyman transport his troops quickly. This news emboldened Vuk and Đurađ Branković, who switched sides and joined Süleyman's camp.

Stefan and Musa tried to prevent the crossing of Süleyman's forces into Europe, with an attack on the fleet that was carrying them. Around Galatia, they managed to destroy some of the ships, but Süleyman's forces still managed to cross the Bosporus Strait.

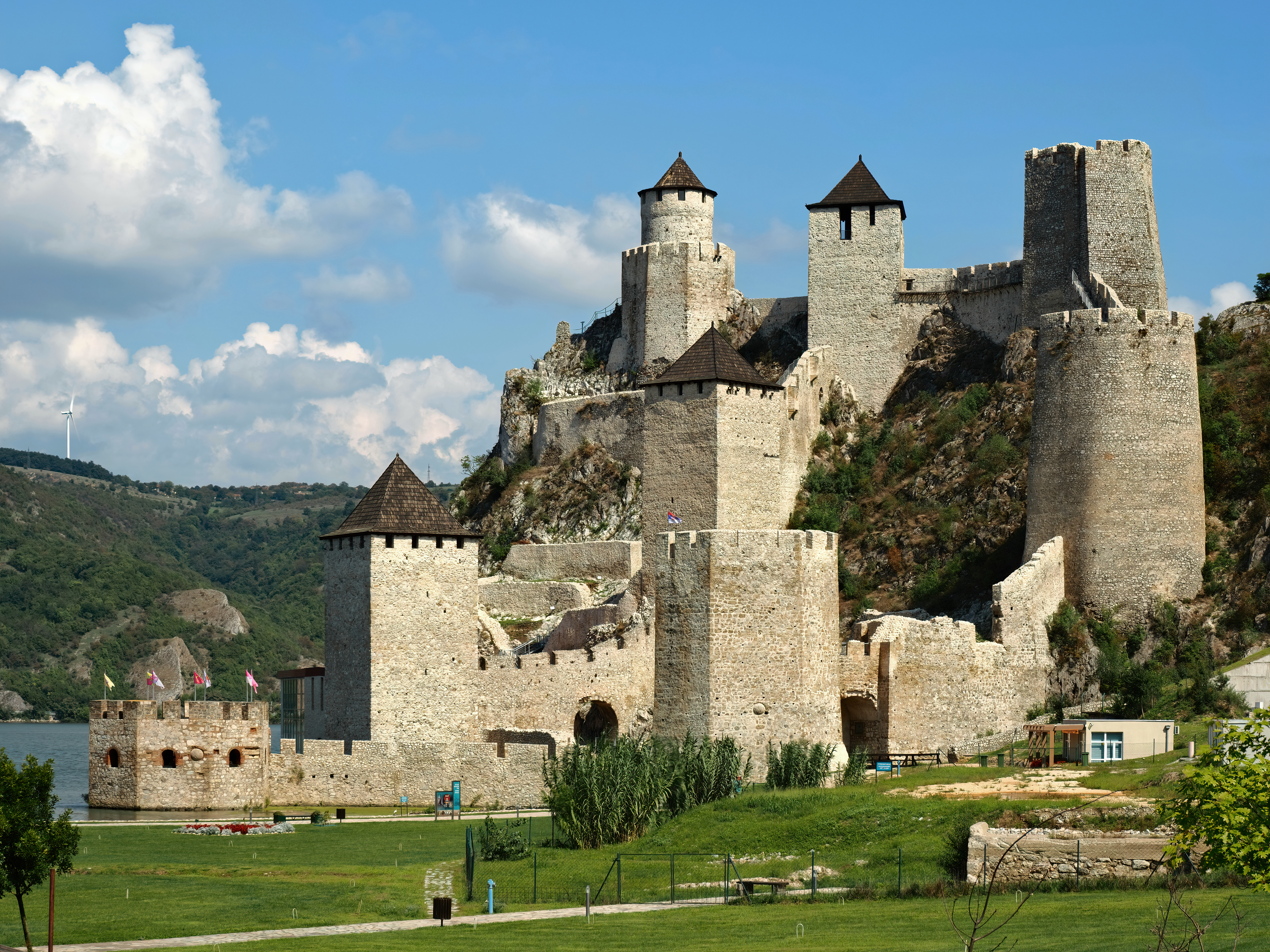
View of Golubac fortress.

The great battle between the two sons of Bayezid occurred on 15 June in the, on the banks of the Golden Horn, in front of the Byzantine land walls of Constantinople. Musa's forces suffered a defeat, and when he left the battlefield, the Despot Stefan pulled back from the battle. The Byzantine Emperor, however, sent ships to evacuate Stefan and his soldiers to Constantinople, despite their different positions in this particular conflict.

In the meantime, Süleyman sent Vuk Lazarević and Lazar Branković (Đurađ's brother) to hasten to Serbia and take over Stefan's domain. However, they both had the misfortune to come across Musa's remnant forces and be captured, in Philippopolis. Vuk Lazarević was immediately executed for his betrayal, and Musa tried to blackmail Đurađ Branković into allying with him, but to no avail.

The two Osman rivals clashed again on 11 July at Edirne, where Musa was defeated once again. During the battle, Musa ordered Lazar's execution. Lazar's body was found after the battle, while Đurađ and Süleyman's forces were looting the deceased soldiers.

Meanwhile, Stefan was rushing to Serbia once again, reaching Golubac, through the Black Sea, in August. Stefan quickly seized Vuk's territory. Another defeat at Serdica marked the end of Süleyman's fight, as he was captured after trying to escape Edirne towards Constantinople. Musa was now the undisputed Osman ruler of Rumelia, and former subjects of Süleyman acknowledged his supremacy, including Đurađ Branković. The relationship between Đurađ and Musa was very uneasy, as Đurađ was enraged over his brother's summary execution. Đurađ entered into negotiations with Stefan, as his appetite for appeasing Ottoman was lessened. At the same time, Musa had refused to send Vuk's remains to Stefan, which taken as a great insult by the Despot. He immediately started raiding Ottoman territory until Musa offered to negotiate.

=== Strengthening of the despotate ===
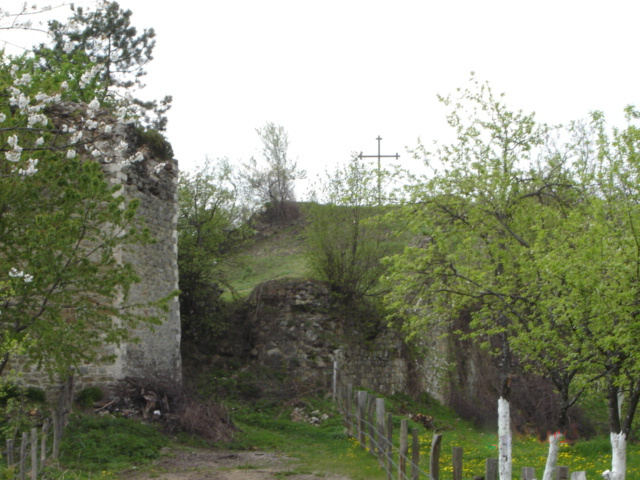
Ruins of Fortress Srebrenica.

Cooperation between Sigismund I and Stefan continued through 1411, when the Serbian despot, in July, stayed in Buda, accompanied by his nobles. On that occasion, there was a strengthening of mutual relations, but the text of an agreement and its provisions have not been preserved. His biographer says that on that occasion Stefan fell in love with the West, and Jovana Kalić said that Stefan since then often went to Buda and be often returned having lavishly been endowed with new lands by the ruler of Hungary, adding that Hungarian sources at that time proclaimed that the Serbian despot subverted the supremacy of the Hungarian king. Stefan received from Sigismund lands in former Hungary, which included villages, towns, and mines in Szatmár County, Bihar County, Szabolcs County, and Torontál County.

By late summer, Sigismund I had made peace with the king of Bosnia, Ostoja and Bosnian nobles, which ended the long-term conflict. Under his control remained the Usora area, while Srebrnica, probably during that year, was transferred to Despot Stefan. At the end of the year, Stefan's sister and the widow of Đurađ II Kotromanić Balšić, Jelena, married Sandalj Hranić Kosača after his peace with Sigismund I. In May of the next year, Stefan was back in Buda with a large entourage. He attended the great council of the European aristocracy, where there was a reconciliation between Sigismund I and the Polish king Vladislav II. Bosnian nobles and the king of Bosnia sat next to Stefan at the council, as well as did several other Balkan rulers and nobles.

At the same time, Stefan's sister Mara met with him on behalf of her son Đurađ, who led his forces in the army of Musa, trying to mend relations between them, in which she succeeded. In the fall of 1411, Musa's forces attacked the town of Selimvria on the Sea of Marmara near Constantinople, in which was the son of Süleyman, Orhan, who was the candidate of Byzantine emperor Manuel II Palaiologos for the Ottoman throne. During the siege, Musa tried to assassinate Đurađ, but he managed to save himself by escaping to the town of Selimvria with his troops. Then, via Thessaloniki, he was back in Serbia and reconciled with his uncle Stefan, which ended the decade-long rivalry between the two most powerful Serbian noble families. As Stefan had no sons of his own, he appointed Đurađ as his successor; and in turn Đurađ accepted Stefan's suzerainty and started closely cooperating with him.

=== Final war against Musa ===
A broad coalition was formed against Musa, in which the Ottoman commanders from some parts of the Balkans, and his only remaining brother, Mehmed I, who ruled part of the former Bayezid Asian countries, joined it. Musa's first attempt to cross into Europe in 1411 was ended in defeat, but they kept fighting on other fronts, so that by the end of that year, Stefan, and the beylerbeys of Skopje and Kyustendil, attacked Musa's domains. Winter weather and the swollen river Marica prevented a linkup of their and Mehmed I's forces. The response to this attack came in early 1412 when Musa, from near Serdica and Čemernik, moved over to the Vranje area and looted it, while Uglješa Vlatković, who ruled that part of the Serbian Despotate, barely saved himself. Musa's forces then continued with a march to Novo Brdo, but the news of the arrival of Despot Stefan triggered his retreat towards Thessaly.

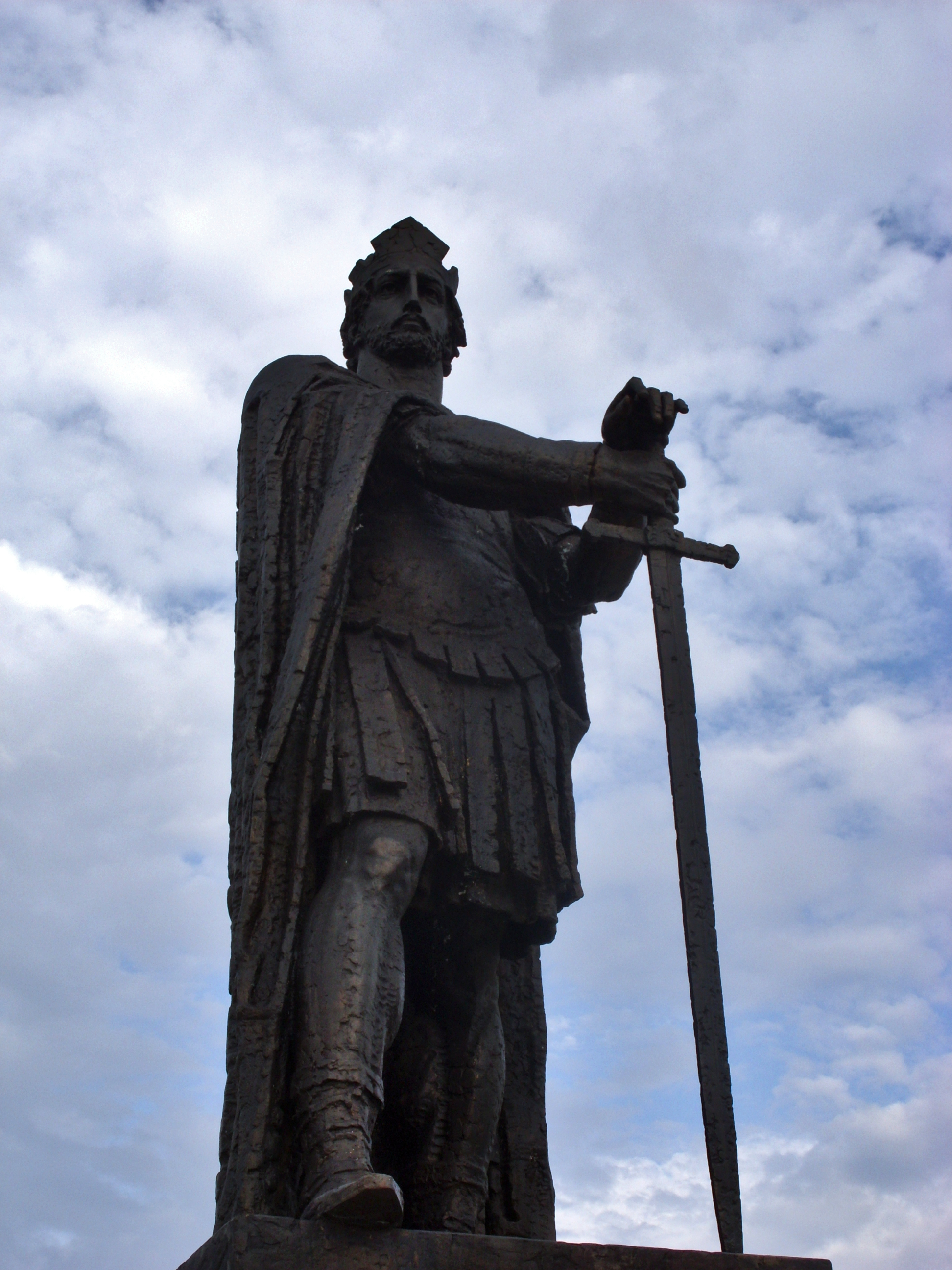
Monument to Stefan.

Musa began a new campaign in 1413, with an attack on Hamza bey, who held Svrljig and Soko Grad. Hamza was captured and executed, and Musa's forces then occupied Bovan and Lipovac, as well as other towns in the Morava Valley (Koprijan, Kruševac, Markovo Kale, Petrus, and Stalać), whose heroic commander was killed, having led an effective resistance. In addition, Musa's troops, according to reports in March that were sent from Novo Brdo to Dubrovnik, devastated Toplica and Braničevo.

During this period, Despot Stefan joined his forces with Sigismund and Sandalj Hranić Kosača. His forces were met with Mehmed I's commanders near Kruševac, and after the agreement, there was a merger of their armies, which were sent to the south. At the mouth of the Toplica River at Dobrič, near Koprijan, they were joined by some Musa supporters, including the commander of the army, Evrenos, after which they continued to Ovče Polje. Stefan, Sandalj Hranić Kosača, and Jovan Morović left troops at Skopska Crna Gora and returned to Serbia, leaving command of them to Đurađ Branković.

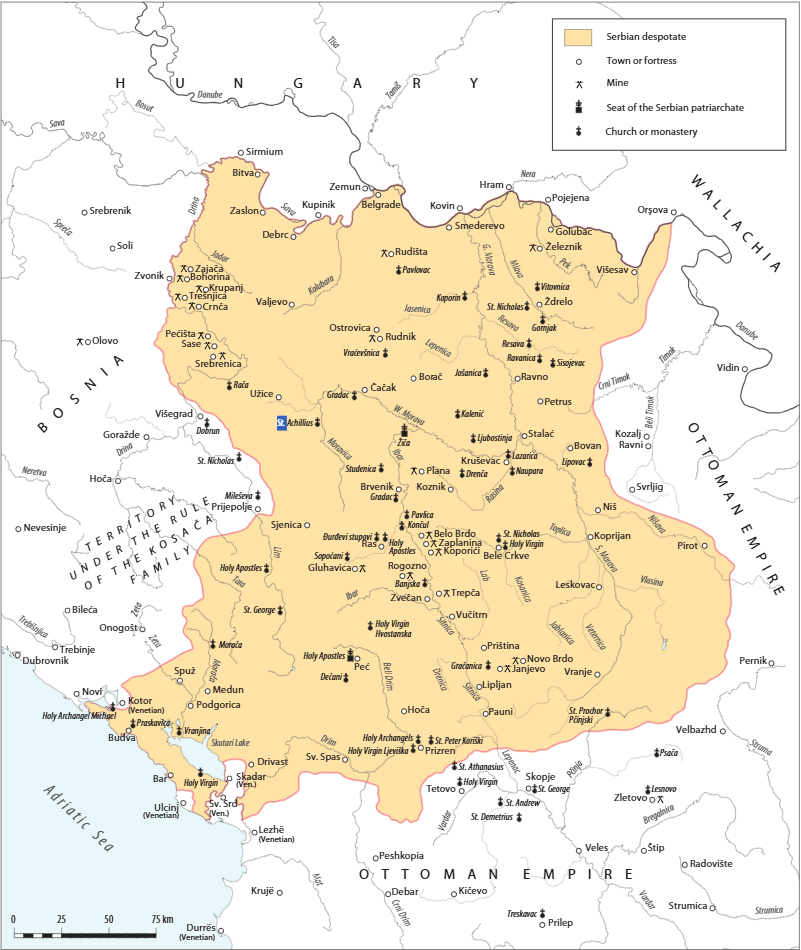
Serbian Despotate around the year 1426

The final and deciding clash of the two remaining Osman brothers was the Battle of Çamurlu. Musa's forces managed to force back the Serbian army in the first phase of fighting, but Đurađ's voivode Radič Postupović attacking from the flank,, managed to break enemy lines and gained the victory for the allied troops. During the withdrawal from the battle, Musa was captured and killed on the Iskar River, marking the end of the Ottoman Interregnum.

Mehmed I was now the undisputed heir of Bayezid the Thunderbolt. He bestowed Stefan and Đurađ with rich gifts and the fortresses of Znepolje and Kurvingrad.

== Period of peace ==
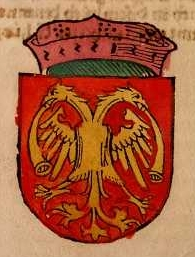
Coat of arms of Lazarević in the Council of Constance (1415) by Ulrich von Richental

The end of the civil war between the sons of Bayezid I was the beginning of many years of peace in Serbia, which enabled further economic and cultural development. Stefan had not intervened militarily in conflicts in the coastal area, as well as in the wars that swept Bosnia in 1413 and brought the Ottomans into it. Sigismund, in 1415, launched two counter-offensives in Bosnia, while the first, earlier that year, failed to oust the Ottomans, and the second, mid-year, ended as a complete disaster. Hungarian forces in July were broken at Lašva, and much of the nobility was captured and taken to Zvečan. They later managed to free themselves through negotiation and purchase, in which Stefan, who brokered the release of Jovan Morović, participated.

The situation in Bosnia was further complicated by the murder of Prince Pavle Radenović in late August 1415, behind which stood King Ostoja and Sandalj Hranić Kosača, which led to clashes between Pavlović and Kosača. In addition, the Ottoman presence and the failures of the Hungarian army led the nobility in Bosnia to turn against Sigismund. Oe consequence was the decision of the Bosnian parliament to take Srebrenica from Stefan, which was not possible to effect.

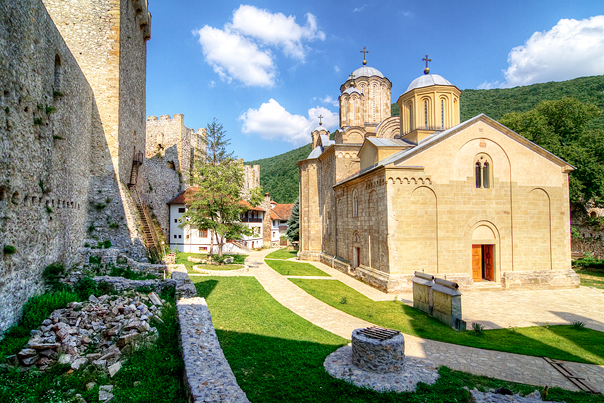
Manasija monastery

At this time, there was a great ecclesiastical council in Constance, which lasted from 1414 to 1418 and gathered a great number of ecclesiastical and secular nobility from Catholic countries. Parliament dealt with the so-called Western Schism and the fate of Jan Hus, who was eventually put to death (6 July 1415), which led to the Hussite Wars. In addition, the threat of the Ottomans, among the participants of the parliament, was also of concern of the Serbian despot, and it is not impossible that he also attended.

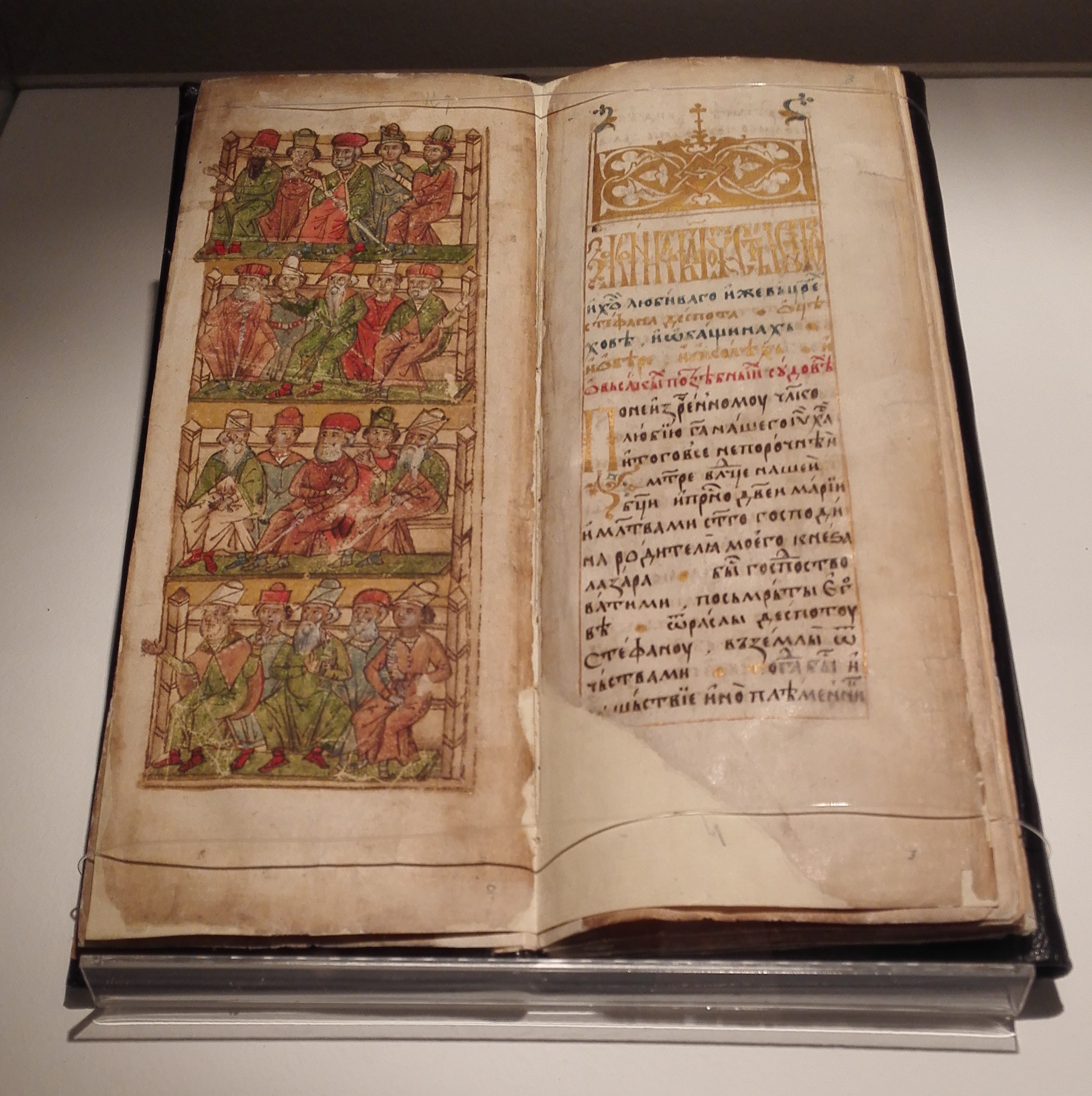
Mining Code of despot Stefan

Stefan, in that period, even though he was a vassal of the Ottoman sultans, did not forsake his efforts to rid himself of the Ottoman domination, as evidenced by the letters he wrote to his subordinates in Hungary, the Byzantines, and legates at the Republic of Venice. He stated that in the case of the creation of a broader anti-Ottoman coalition, Serbia would join it. During the period of peace, Stefan had finished his monumental endowment, the Manasija monastery, near present-day Despotovac. Its construction began in 1407 but was repeatedly interrupted by conflicts with the Ottoman Empire (1409, 1411–1413); it was finished in 1418.

Stefan was a patron of art and culture, providing support and shelter to scholars from Serbia and exiles from surrounding countries occupied by the Ottomans. He was educated at his parents' home, and he spoke and wrote Serbo-Slavic; he also could speak Greek and was familiar with Latin. Under his rule, he issued the Code of Mines in 1412 in Novo Brdo, the economic center of Serbia.

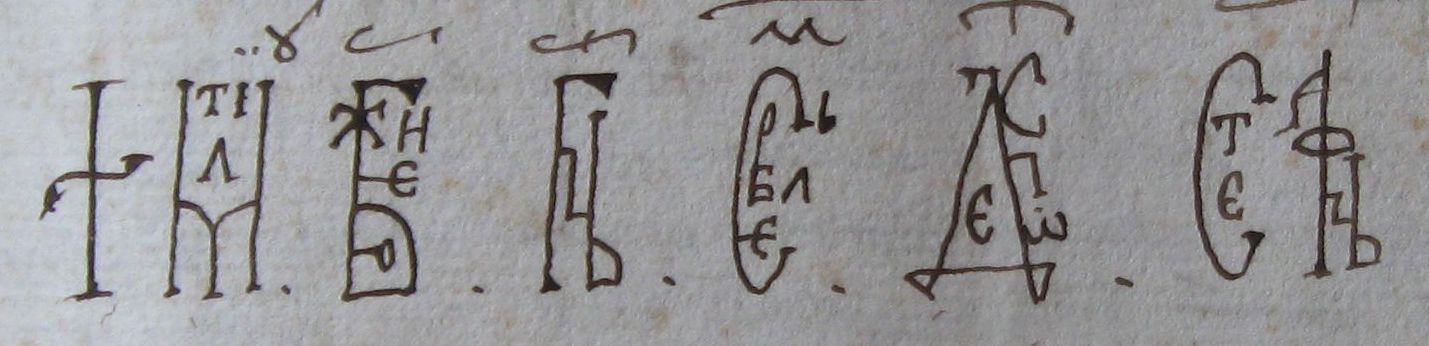
Signature of Despot Stefan.

He was an author, and his main works include Slovo ljubve (A Homage to Love), which he dedicated to his brother Vuk, and Natpis na mramornom stubu na Kosovo (Inscription on the Marble Pillar at Kosovo).

Some works he wrote during his reign have been preserved. During his reign, a rich transcribing activity – the transcription School of Resava – was founded at the Manasija monastery. More Christian works, and classical works, were transcribed there than in all times preceding the despot's rule.

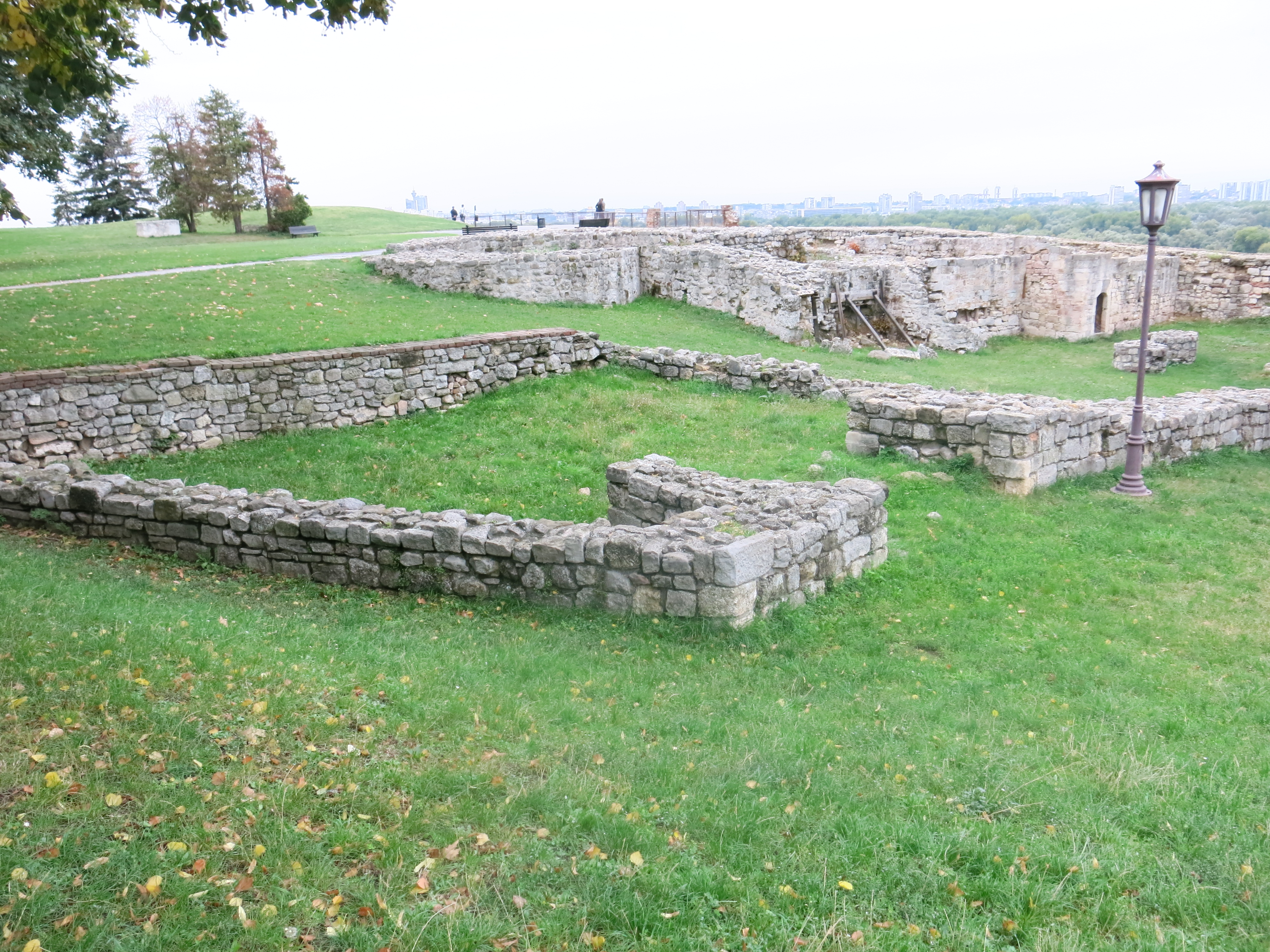
The remains of Stefan's Castle in the northwestern part of the Upper Town of Belgrade Fortress, which was destroyed during Great Turkish War 1688–1690. The citadel or inner town was first designed as a Byzantium fortress in the twelfth century. It was rebuilt during the rule of despot Stefan Lazarevic during the period between 1404 and 1427.

During the short time that the life of the founder and monastery coincided (1407–27), the achievements made in Resava established it as an important part of the history of Serbia and Slavic culture in general. It was there that Bulgarian-born Constantine the Philosopher, a reputable "Serbian teacher", translator, and historian, established the famous orthographic school of Resava to correct errors in the ecclesiastical literature incurred by numerous translations and incorrect transcriptions, and to thoroughly change the previous orthography.

Constantine's essay on how Slavic books should be written recommended a complicated orthography that subsequently many authors adopted and used for a long time. Regardless of subsequent criticism of this endeavor, the very fact that in Serbia in the 15th century, an essay was written on orthography and its rules is important. Until the very end of the 17th century, documents confirm the reputation of translations and transcripts originating from the Resava School.

== Death ==
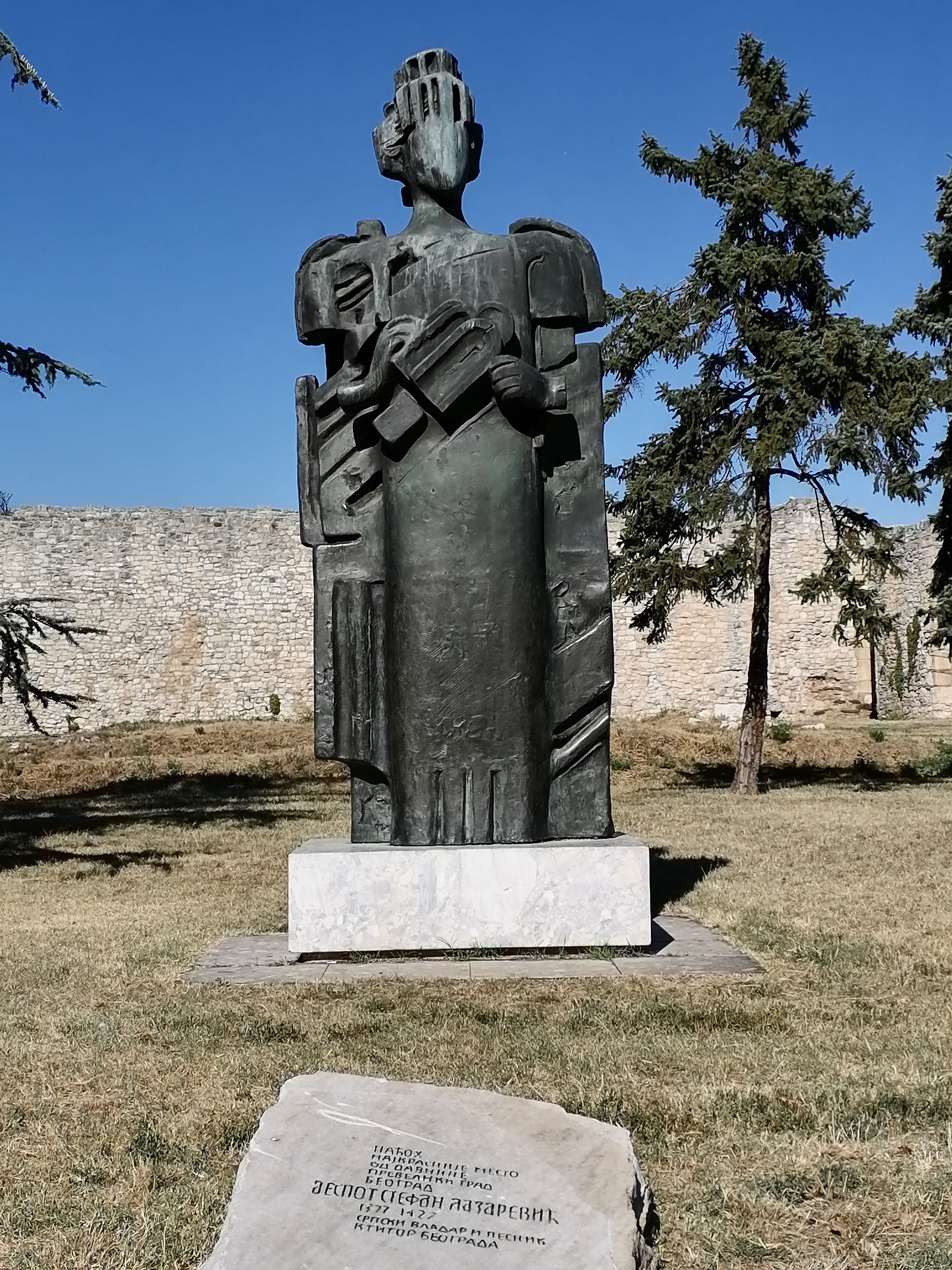
Monument to Stefan the Tall, Kalemegdan

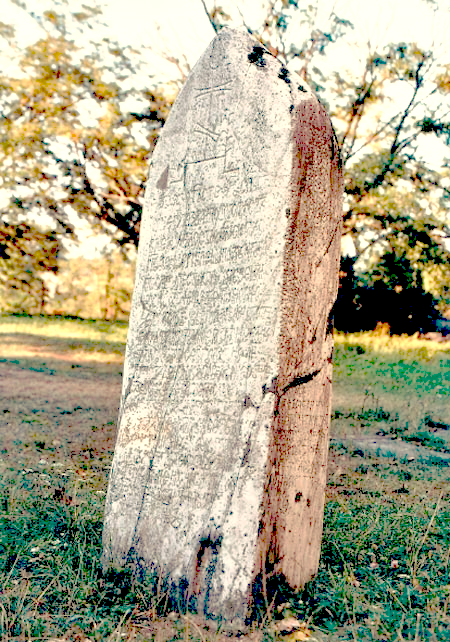
Despot Stefan Lazarević Memorial from 1427

Like most of the rulers and noblemen of those times, Despot Stefan loved and used to saddle his horse often and ride with his escort to hunt in nearby villages. On one of the returns from the castle in Belgrade Fortress, finding himself near the place known as Glava, or Glavica, at Mt. Kosmaj, Stefan stopped his escort to ride out to hunt. As accustomed, he stretched his hand forward to let the hawk onto it, but his body did not move. The whole escort noticed the way his body was leaning from one side to the other, becoming aware that something unusual was happening. Everybody knew his imposing pose on a horse, and they all doubtfully watched him fall to the ground helplessly. According to Constantine the Philosopher, his sudden death on 19 July 1427 was accompanied by a storm that made the sky over Belgrade turn black, and the thunder covered his whispered last words, "Get George, get George!"

Stefan's death was experienced as the Last Judgement, a disaster, as Judgement Day among people. Dreading future troubles, the whole state grieved for their ruler, whom they knew from the beginning as "the chosen messenger of the new age". The death presaged the hardest period in the history of the Serbian state and people, represented by the destruction of the loss of state identity. The old Byzantine-South Slavonic prophecies (the Revelation of Pseudo-Methodius, the apocryphal Visions of Daniel, and the Oracles of Leo the Wise) are usually interpreted as Ishmaelite, that is, Muslim, conquests as a result of Christian sins. For the Orthodox Christians, in the 15th century, this topos became especially alluring, since it corresponded to the idea of "the end of the world" in the year 7000 "from the creation of the world" (=1491/1492 AD), according to the Byzantine calendar.

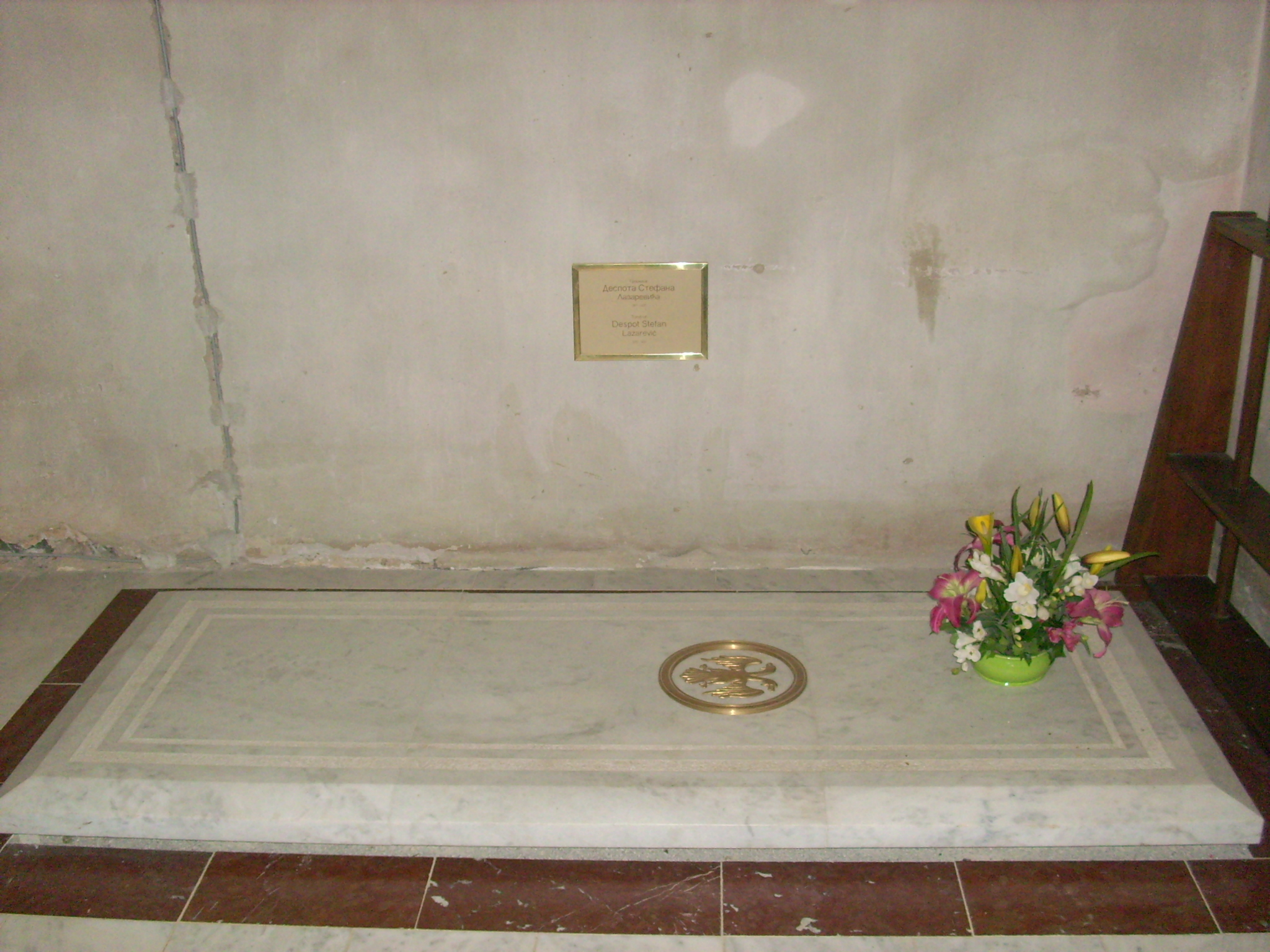
The tomb of despot Stefan in the Manasija monastery

To preserve the memory of the passing of the favored and honored ruler, a stone marker was erected at the place where Stefan fell off his horse. In saying farewell to their master, his closest associates, who were escorting him at the moment of the accident, built a monument of marble, leaving messages of loyalty and respect. These inscriptions show the monument was built by Đurađ Zubrović, a nobleman from the territory, to which the hamlet Glava belonged, as well as a knight from Despot's escort. Stefan was buried at Resava.

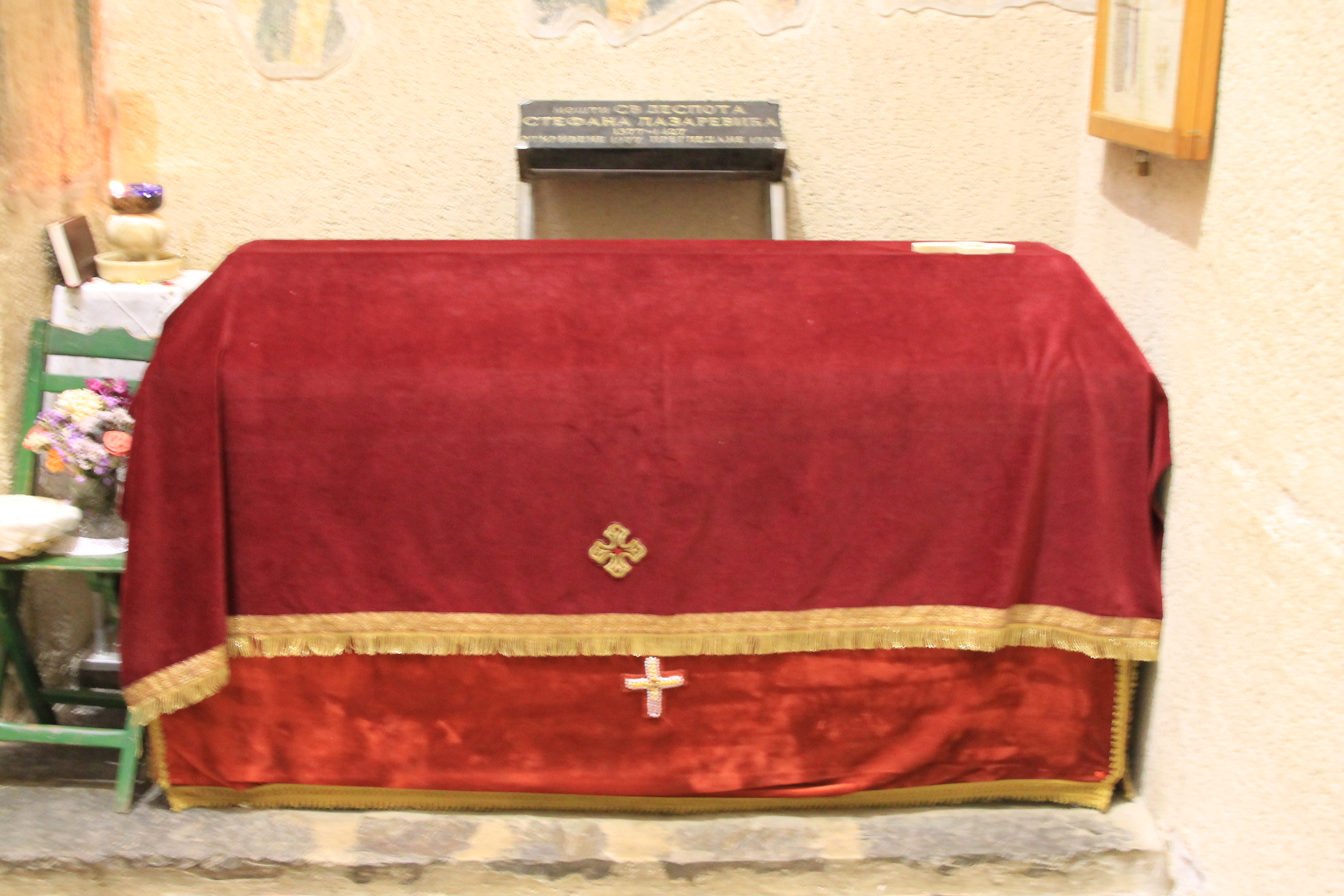
Case with the relics of despot Stefan, Koporin Monastery

Many researchers believe that the cause of death of the despot Stefan was a stroke or a heart attack, while some doubt this, looking for the cause in a conspiracy, using statements of his biographer Constantine the Philosopher: "When he was in a place called Glavica, having lunch he went out to hunt, and while he was still hunting...". These researchers suspect that the despot Stefan was poisoned. He probably became more pro-Western than he should have been. From the Serbian perspective, there was a difference between the Eastern and Western world, with Serbia situated somewhere between the two.

== Veneration ==
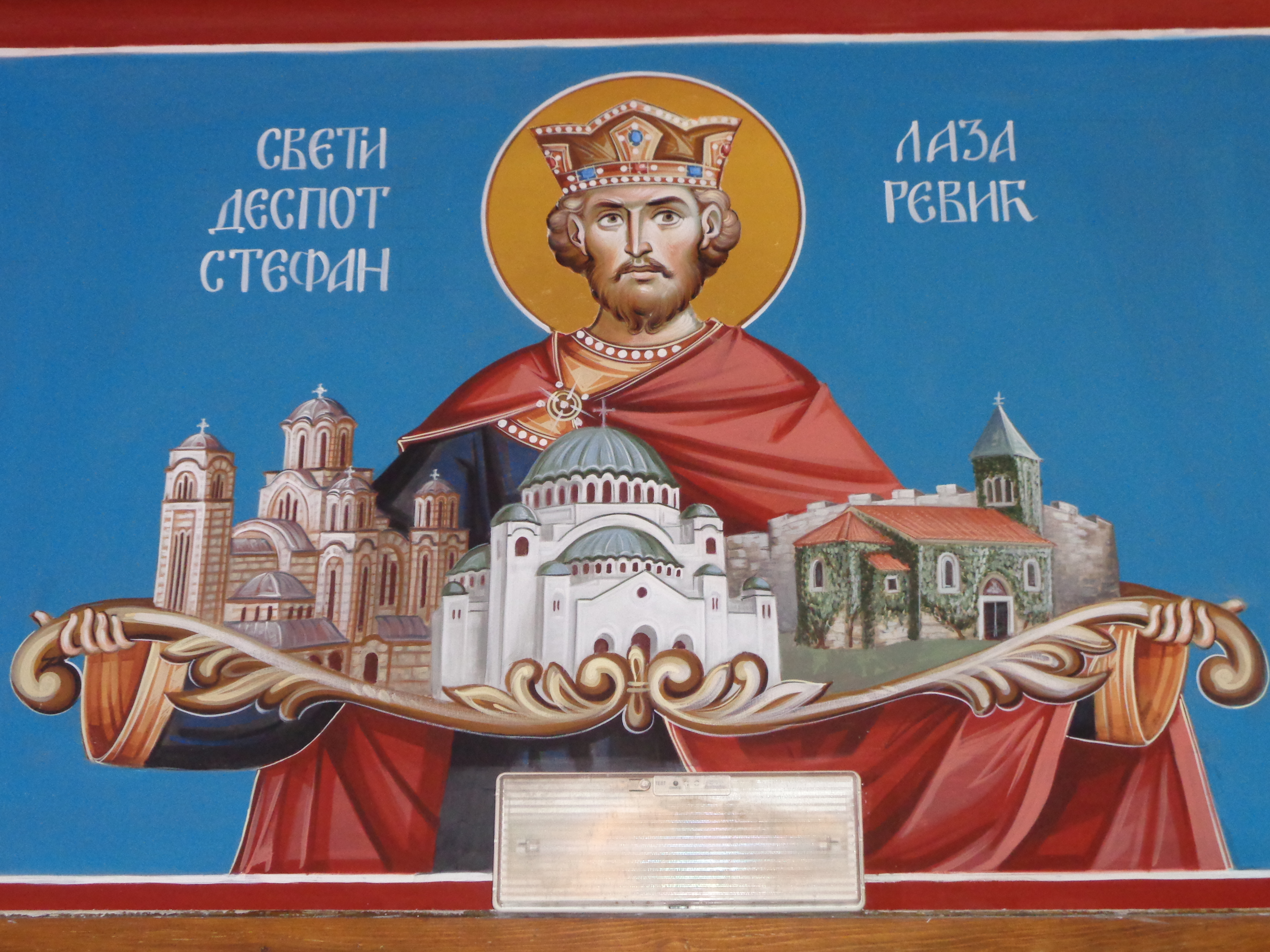
Fresco in Church of the Holy First Martyr Stephen, Belgrade, Serbia

The Serbian Orthodox Church canonized Stefan on 1 August 1927, the 500th anniversary of his death, under the name Saint Despot Stefan of Serbia, although he is more commonly referred to as Saint Stefan the Tall. He is commemorated on 1 August (19 July according to the Julian calendar) alongside his mother, Saint Eugenia. A reliquary which is believed to contain his remains is housed in the Koporin monastery and is opened twice a year, on 1 August, the saint's feast day, and 15 August, the feast of the translation of the relics of Saint Stephen, which is the monastery's slava (feast day).

In 2023, Saint Despot Stefan was chosen to be the patron saint of the Serbian Armed Forces, with his feast becoming the army's slava.

== Literary works ==
Apart from the biographical notes in charters and especially in the Code on The Mine Novo Brdo (1412), Stefan Lazarević wrote three literary works:

- The Grave Sobbing for prince Lazar (1389)
- The Inscription on the Kosovo Marble Column (1404)
- A Homage to Love (1409), a poetic epistle to his brother Vuk
- Law on Mines
- Translation of a Greek work titled On Future Times

He was probably the patron of the most extensively illuminated Serbian manuscript, the Serbian Psalter, which is now kept in the Bavarian State Library in Munich.

== Titles ==
- "Lord(Gospodar) of all the Serbs and Podunavlje" (господар свих Срба и Подунавља), inherited through his father.
- An inscription names him Despot, Lord "of all Serbs and Podunavlje and Posavje and part of Hungarian lands and Bosnian [lands], and also Maritime Zeta" (свим Србљем и Подунављу и Посавју и делом угарске земље и босанске, а још и Поморју зетском).
- "Despot of the Kingdom of Rascia and Lord of Serbia" (Stephanus dei gratia regni Rassia despotus et dominus Servie).
- "Despot, Lord of Rascia" (Stephanus Despoth, Dominus Rasciae), in the founding charter of the Order of the Dragon (1408). He was the first on the list.
- "Despot, Lord of all Serbs and the Maritime" (господин всем Србљем и Поморију деспот Стефан).

== See also ==
- Đurađ Branković (despot 1427–1456)
- Mahmud Pasha Angelović (grand vizier 1453–1468; 1472–1473)
- Despotate of Serbia
- Despotate of Morea
- Ottoman Empire
- Second Scutari War

== Sources ==
- Bataković, Dušan T., ed. (2005). Histoire du peuple serbe [History of the Serbian People] (in French). Lausanne: L'Age d'Homme. ISBN 978-2-8251-1958-7.
- Bogdanović, Dimitrije; Mihaljčić, Rade; Ćirković, Sima; Kalić, Jovanka; Kovačević-Kojić, Desanka; Blagojević, Miloš; Babić-Đorđević, Gordana; Đurić, Vojislav J.; Spremić, Momčilo; Božić, Ivan; Pantić, Miroslav; Ivić, Pavle (1982). Kalić, Jovanka (ed.). Историја српског народа: Доба борби за очување и обнову државе (1371–1537). Belgrade: Srpska književna zadruga.
- Ćirković, Sima (2004). The Serbs. Malden: Blackwell Publishing. ISBN 978-1-4051-4291-5.
- Fine, John Van Antwerp Jr. (1994) [1987]. The Late Medieval Balkans: A Critical Survey from the Late Twelfth Century to the Ottoman Conquest. Ann Arbor, Michigan: University of Michigan Press. ISBN 0-472-08260-4.
- Ostrogorsky, George (1956). History of the Byzantine State. Oxford: Basil Blackwell.
- Purković, Miodrag (1978). Knez i despot Stefan Lazarević. Sveti arhijerejski sinod Srpske pravoslavne crkve.
- Stojaković, Slobodanka (2006). Деспот Стефан Лазаревић. Српско нумизматичко друштво. ISBN 978-86-902071-6-9.
- Suica, Marko (17 October 2017). "Effects of the early ottoman conquests on the state and social structure of the Lazarević Principality". academia.edu.
- Thomson, Francis J. (1993). "Archbishop Daniel II of Serbia: Hierarch, Hagiographer, Saint: With Some Comments on the Vitae regum et archiepiscoporum Serbiae and the Cults of Mediaeval Serbian Saints". Analecta Bollandiana. 111 (1–2): 103–134. doi:10.1484/J.ABOL.4.03279.
- Trifunović, Đorđe, ed. (1979). "Stefan Lazarević". Књижевни радови. 477. Srpska književna zadruga.
- Veselinović, Andrija (2006) [1995]. Држава српских деспота [State of the Serbian Despots]. Belgrade: Zavod za udžbenike i nastavna sredstva. ISBN 86-17-12911-5.

Stefan Lazarević Lazarević dynasty Born: circa 1372/77 Died: 19 July 1427
Regnal titles
Preceded by Lazar of Serbia	Serbian Prince; 1389–1402	Vacant Title next held by Đurađ Branković
New creation	Serbian Despot; 1402–1427	Vacant Title next held by Đurađ Branković
