= Kruševac Fortress =

Forts in Serbia

Kruševac Fortress City of Prince Lazar
- Крушевачки град Лазарев Град; Град цара Лазара
- Kruševac, Šumadija and Western Serbia Region, Serbia
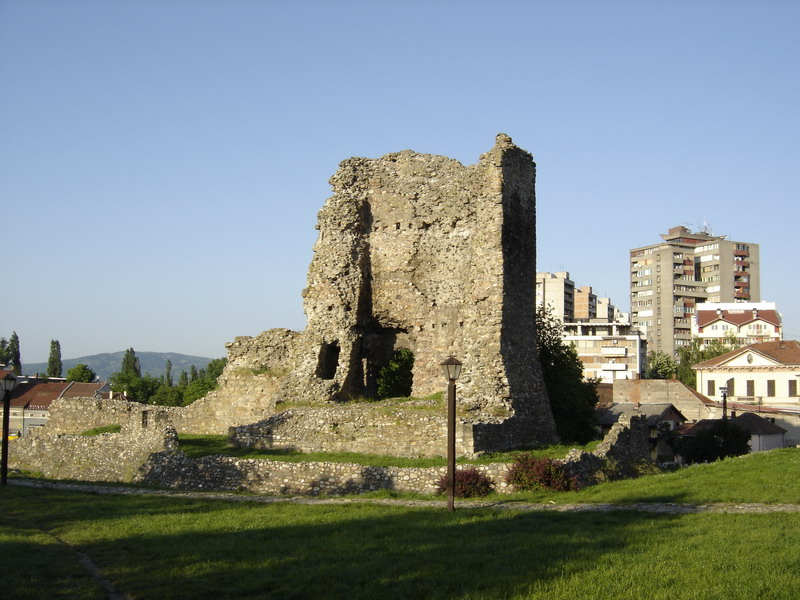
- Donjon tower

Site information
- Type: Fortification
- Open to the public: Yes

Location
- Coordinates: 43°35′04″N 21°19′19″E

Site history
- Built: 1381
- Built by: Lazar Hrebeljanović
- Materials: Stone

Kruševac Fortress or City of Prince Lazar (Serbian: Крушевачки град, Kruševački grad) was a medieval fortified town in Kruševac, Serbia, former capital of Prince Lazar. The city housed the court church, Lazarica. Today, all that remains of the town are ruins.

== History ==
The Fortress of Kruševac was first mentioned in 1381, so it was most likely built by Prince Lazar, becoming the seat of his realm – Moravian Serbia. He ruled his country from Kruševac, as attested by signature and record in a charter issued in 1387 which includes the phrase In the famous city of my dominion Kruševac (у славноме граду господства ми Крушевцу).

Lazar's son and successor Stefan Lazarević managed the despotate from Kruševac until 1405, when the capital was moved to Belgrade, which he began renewing and refortifying in that year. Kruševac never lost its strategic importance, however. It was the meeting place of despot Stefan and Sultan Mehmed I in 1413.

Struggles over the control of the city took place throughout the first half of the 15th century. It was occupied by the Turks briefly in 1413 and in 1427, and by Hungarians in 1437. After signing an agreement on the restoration of the Despotate, Đurađ Branković regained Kruševac in 1444. In 1454, the Ottomans launched an offensive with the goal of subduing the entirety of Serbia. At the beginning of the offensive, the Ottomans suffered enormous losses, especially in the Battle of Kruševac. The massive casualties inflicted on the Ottomans prompted Sultan Mehmed the Conqueror to personally reinforce his offensive using his entire Rumelian army. The city finally fell under Ottoman rule, along with the rest of the Despotate, later in 1454.

Under Ottoman rule, Kruševac was renamed Aladža Hisar, Turkish for Colorful City, because of the diversity of materials from which the fortress was built. The Lazarica, which was built by Prince Lazar, was vandalized by the Ottomans, and was used for gunpowder storage.

== Archaeological site ==
The best-preserved part of Prince Lazar's former capital is the palace church of St. Stephen, Lazarica. Little is left today of the Hard town of Kruševac, as it was called by Constantine of Kostenets. Today, the surviving remains consist of the Donjon Tower, through which one entered the city, and part of the eastern wall. Inside the towers today are a hallway with a staircase still remains; this once gave access to higher levels and to an exit onto the city walls. One of the curiosities of this particular tower was that it was plastered with pebbles, a rare style and probably one of the reasons that prompted the Turks to name the fortress "Colorful City". The area of the former fortress has been converted into a park and now holds a museum. The park is almost entirely neglected, except around the church. The walls and buildings remains are very poorly preserved and unmarked, with no protection from vandals. Parts of the walls were torn down during the last century to build houses; stone from the fortress was probably used in constructing nearby homes.

Kruševac Fortress was declared a Monument of Culture of Exceptional Importance in 1979, and it is now protected by the Republic of Serbia.

== See also ==
- Monuments of Culture of Exceptional Importance
- Tourism in Serbia
- Prince Lazar
- Lazarica

== Sources ==
- Monuments of Culture in Serbia: "ЦРКВА СВ.СТЕФАНА ЛАЗАРИЦА СА КРУШЕВАЧКИМ ГРАДОМ" (SANU) (in Serbian and English)
- Републички завод за заштиту споменика културе – Београд. "Црква Св. Стефана Лазарица са Крушевачким градом". БАЗА НЕПОКРЕТНИХ КУЛТУРНИХ ДОБАРА. Archived from the original on 2016-03-04.
