= Morava architectural school =

Ecclesiastical architectural style

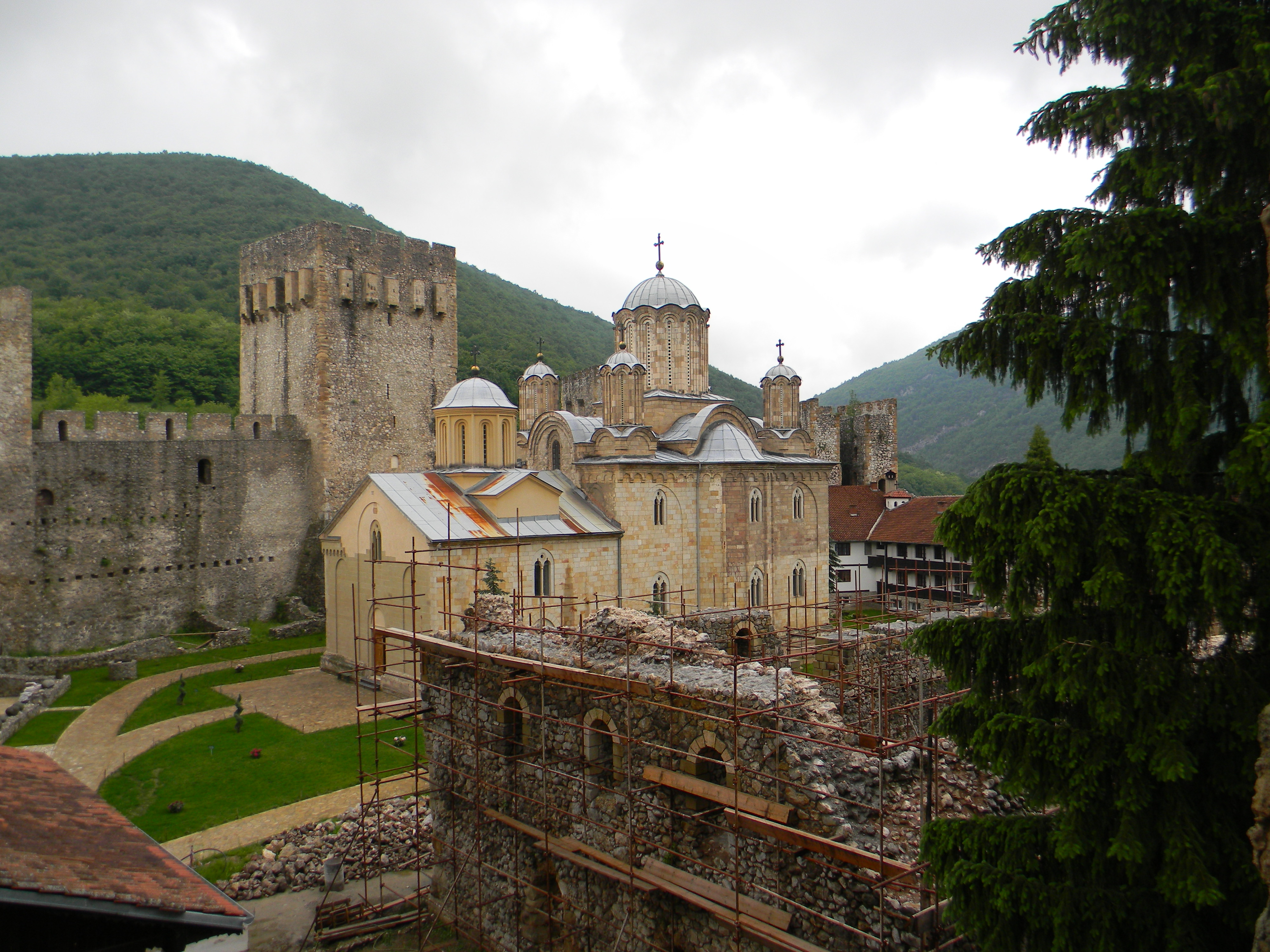
- Manasija complex
- Branch: Architecture
- Years active: c. 1370–1459 (originally)
- Location: Serbia
- Major figures: Lazarević dynasty ktetors
- Influences: Mount Athos

Morava architectural school (Serbian: Moravska škola arhitekture, Serbian Cyrillic: Моравска школа архитeктуре), also known as the Morava style (Serbian: Moravski stil, Serbian Cyrillic: Моравски стил), or simply as the Morava school (Serbian: Moravska škola, Serbian Cyrillic: Моравска школа), is an ecclesiastical architectural style that flourished in the Serbian Late Middle Ages (ca. 1370–1459), during the reign of the Lazarević and Branković dynasties.

The churches and monasteries were built by the rulers Lazar Hrebeljanović (1370–1389), Stefan Lazarević (1402–1427) and Đurađ Branković (1427–1456) and their nobility. The first endowment was the royal tomb of Ravanica. The main achievement of the Morava School is the splendor of the sculptural elements. The decorative stone plastic of the Moravska School represents one of the most original artistic achievements of medieval Serbian art. Decorative elements characteristic of this artistic school typically consist of geometric arabesque with stylized floral ornaments and interlaces, which include only scarce figurative details. Sculpture was usually painted, and thus, very vivid in effect.

== History ==
The architecture in Serbia, from about 1370 until its fall to the Ottomans in 1459, was very experimental. During this time of adverse political circumstances, a remarkable flurry of building activity took place. It has been labeled the "Morava School" and declared a "national style" by Gabriel Millet. The katholikon of Ravanica Monastery, built in the 1370s, may be considered the inaugural statement of this style, which drew its characteristics from Mount Athos, from Serbian architecture itself of the 1340s and 1350s, and from other still unclear sources. The appearance of lateral apses along the flanks of the Ravanica church clearly suggests the growing importance of the Athonite monastic formula, juxtaposed with the five-domed church scheme. The most perplexing aspect of this architecture however are its sculptural laments, whose sheer quantity, exuberance, and variety of motifs have defied explanations.

Evident on a large number of buildings, from Lazarica in Kruševac to Naupara, Rudenica, Veluce, Ljubostinja, and Milentija, the style of decoration displays affinities with Armenia and Georgia, the world of Islam, and even Venice and the West. Its persistence into the fifteenth century, on church facades such as that of Kalenić Monastery (built 1413–1417), reveals the vitality of this new medium, which in its later stages began to incorporate human and animal forms, often related to mythological themes presumably drawn from manuscript illuminations. In the waning years of Serbia's independence, the imminent threat of Ottoman forces prompted major efforts in fortification architecture. Nor did this security-related phenomenon bypass religious settings. The Manasija (Resava) Monastery in Serbia, for example, incorporates a system of massive walls, ten towers, and a huge dungeon, all built in 1407–1418. Endowed by the Serbian despot Stefan Lazarević, the strongly defended Manasija became not only his final resting place but also the last major center of cultural activity in Serbia before its fall to the Ottomans in 1459.

== Gallery ==
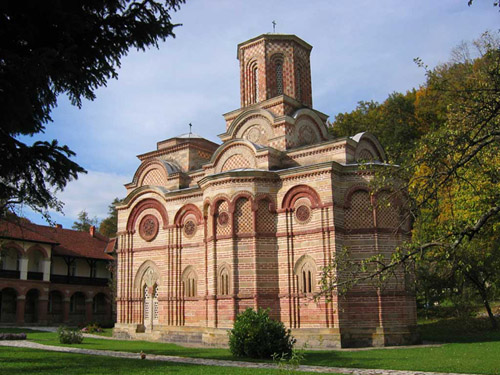
Kalenić Monastery, late Byzantine trikonchonos, after 1407.

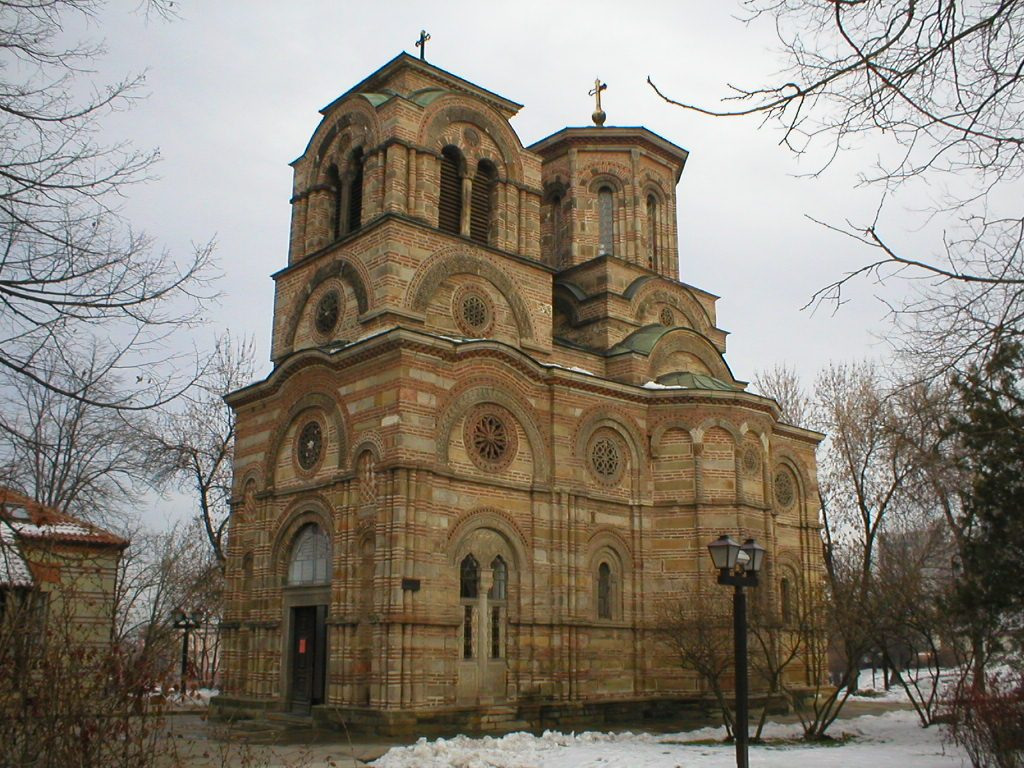
Royal chapel Lazarica, build by Prince Lazar in Kruševac.

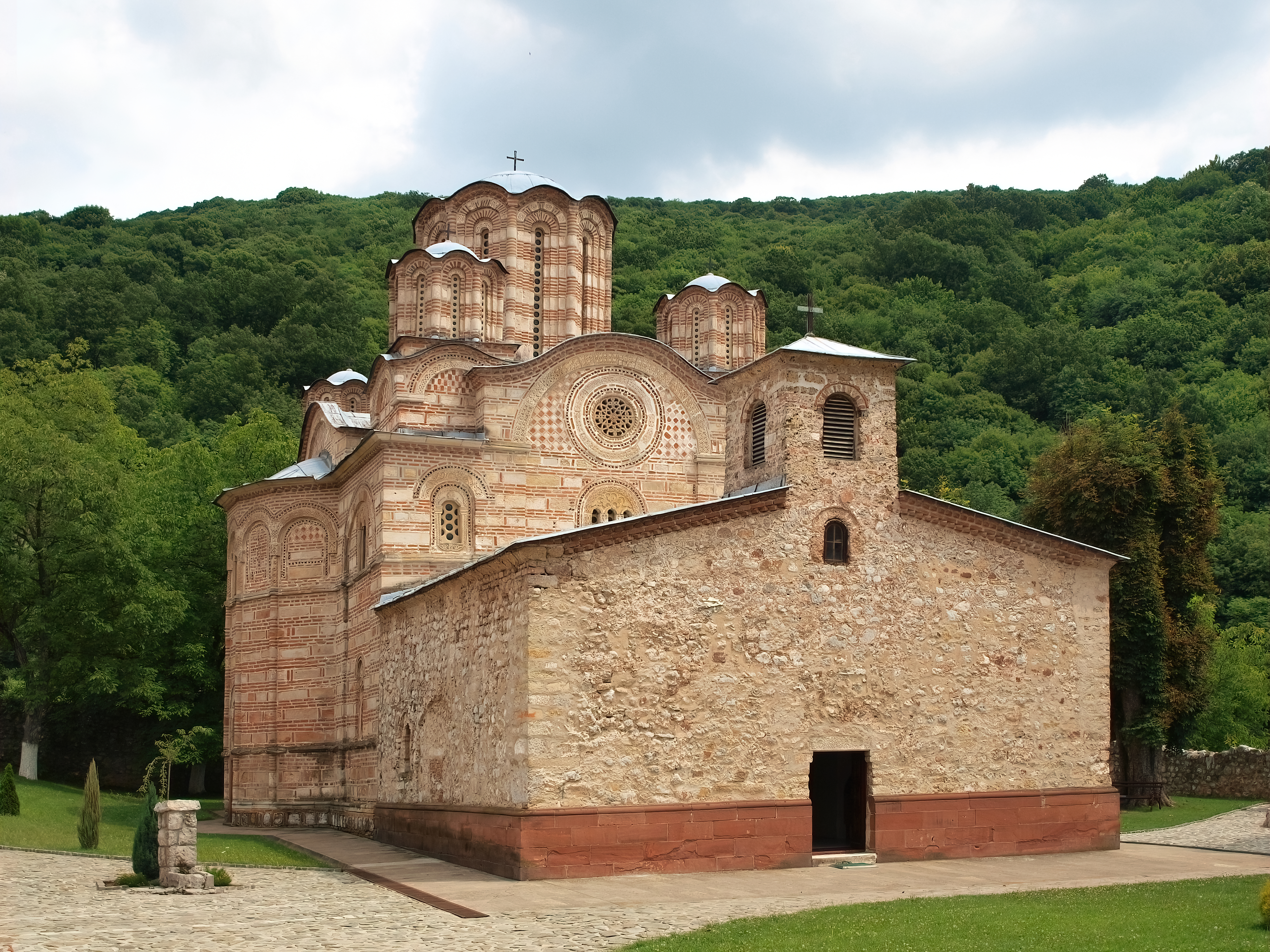
Monastery Ravanica.

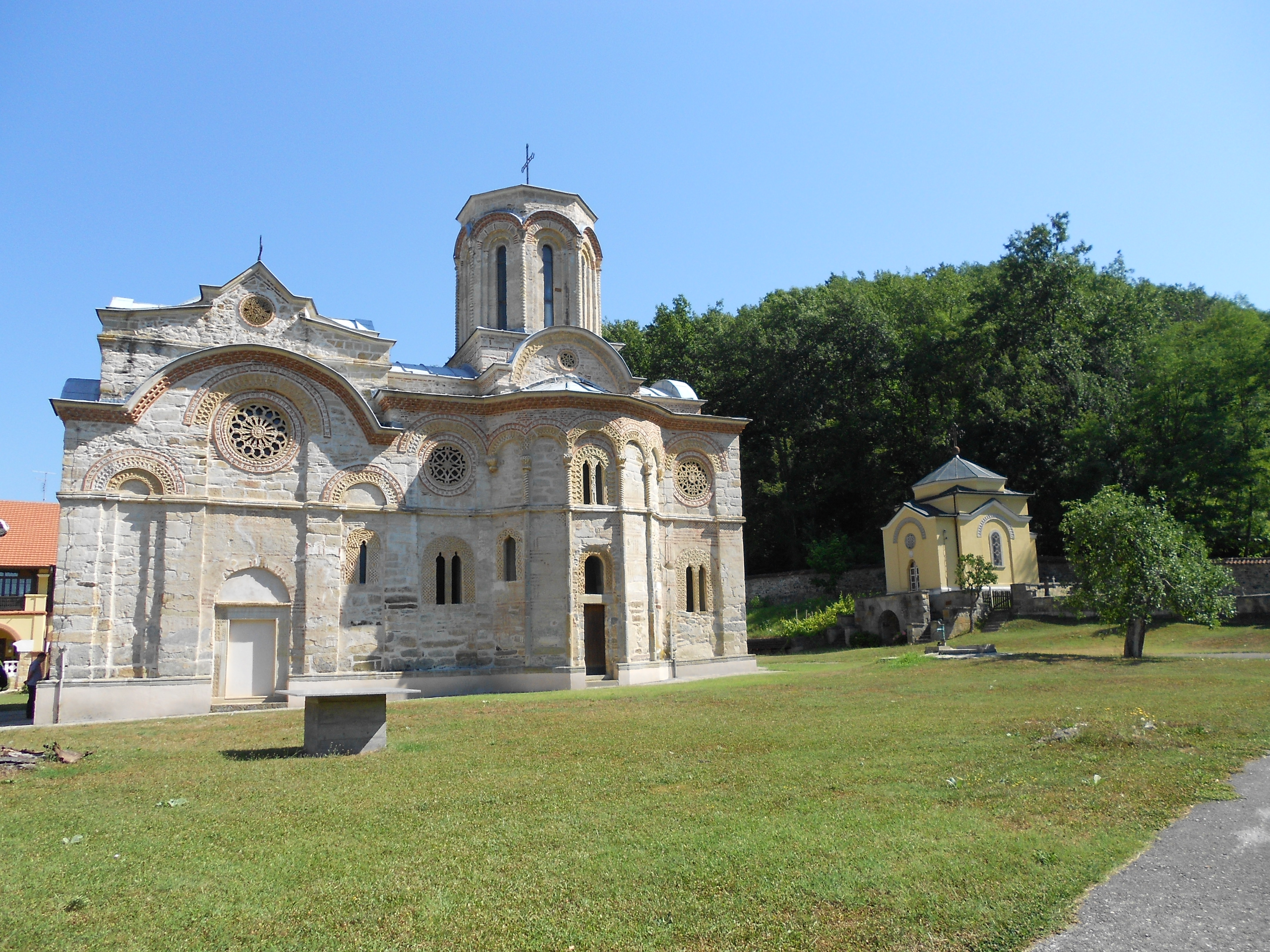
Monastery Ljubostinja.

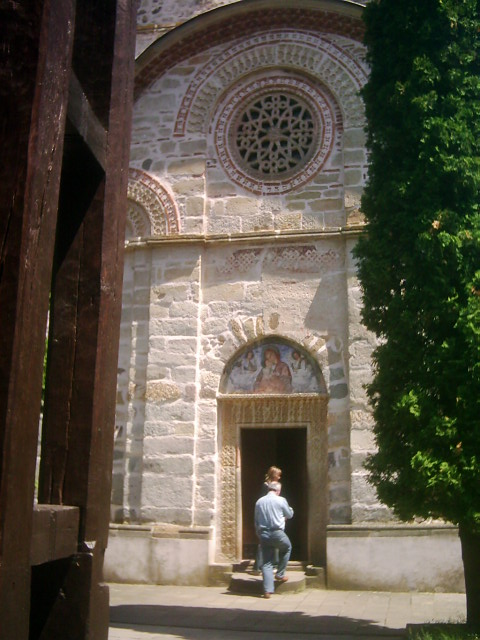
Main portal and rosete in Ljubostinja.

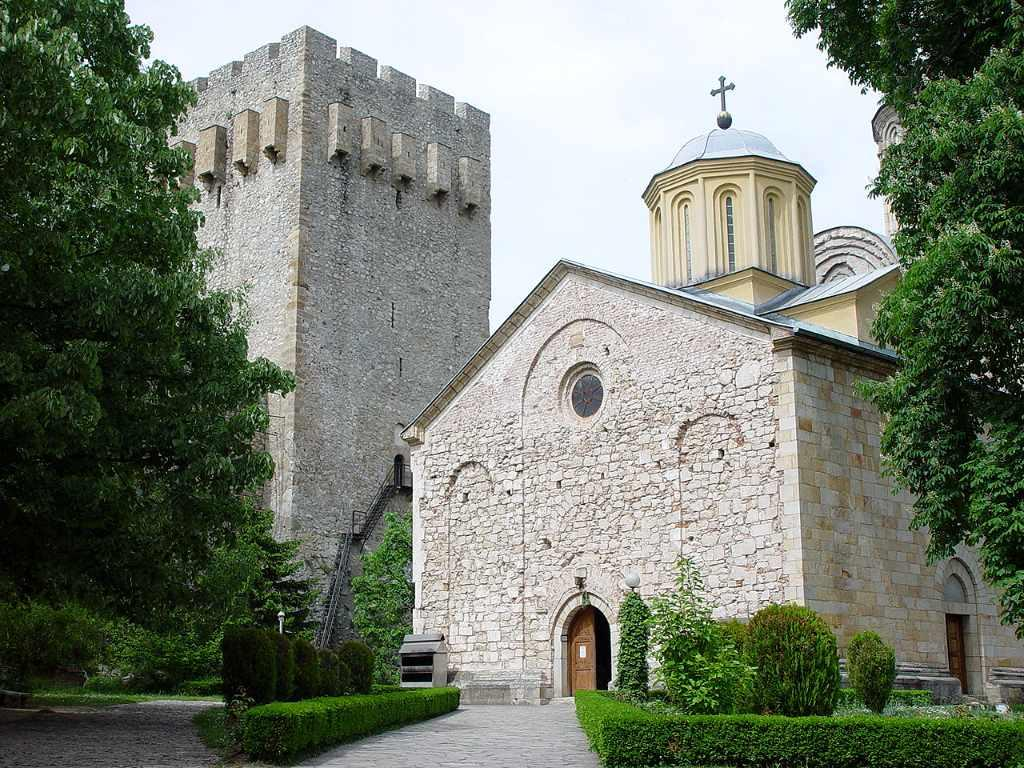
Narthex of Manasija near Despotovac.

== See also ==
- Architecture of Serbia
- Serbian Orthodox Church
- List of Serbian Orthodox monasteries
