= Lazarica Church =

- Црква Лазарица/Crkva Lazarica
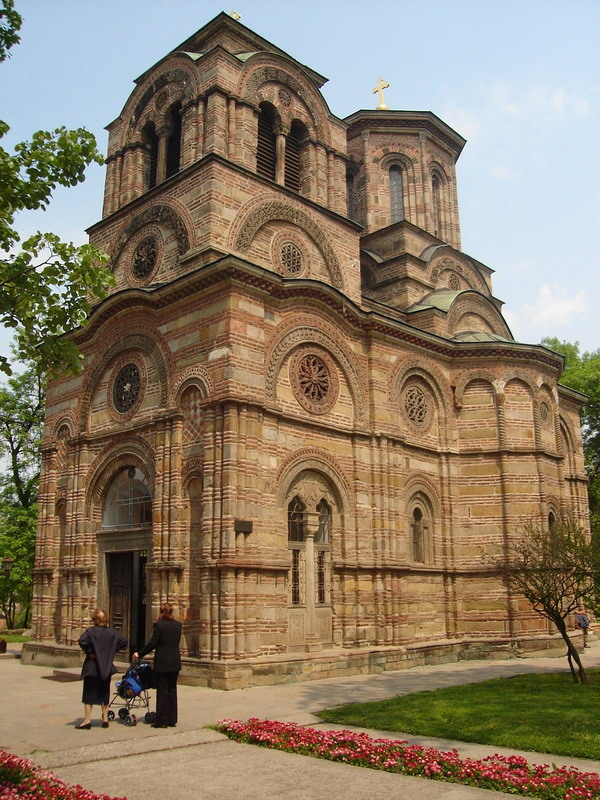
- Lazarica Church

- Location within Serbia
- 43°35′2.77″N 21°19′16.46″E
- Location: Kruševac
- Country: Serbia
- Denomination: Serbian Orthodox Church, Eastern Orthodoxy
- Website: http://www.lazarica.rs/

History
- Status: Church
- Founded: 1378
- Founder: Lazar of Serbia
- Dedication: Saint Stephen

Architecture
- Functional status: Active
- Heritage designation: Monument of Culture of Exceptional Importance
- Designated: 1979
- Style: Morava Architectural Style

Specifications
- Height: 17.25 m (57 ft) internal height
- Materials: Stone

Administration
- Diocese: Eparchy of Kruševac

Church of the Holy First Martyr Stephen (Serbian: Црква Светог Првомученика Стефана/Crkva Svetog Prvomučenika Stefana), better known as the Lazarica Church (Serbian: Црква Лазарица/Crkva Lazarica), is a Serbian Orthodox church in Kruševac, Serbia. It was built in 1375-1378 as an endowment of prince Lazar of Serbia. Lazarica, as an outstanding achievement of the Serbian medieval architecture, was declared a Monument of Culture of Exceptional Importance in 1979, and it is protected by the Republic of Serbia. Lazarica was built as a prototype of the Morava school of architecture, as a palace church associated with the Kruševac Fortress, the capital of Prince Lazar. Today, only Lazarica and parts of the keep remain from the vast fortress complex.

== History ==
Information about the founding of the church can be found in the "Žitije despota Stefana Lazarevića" by Constantine of Kostenets. Lazar of Serbia built the church at the same time as the fortifications for the capital Kruševac. In 1455, Kruševac fell under Ottoman Empire rule, and the church was abandoned and desecrated. Lazarica was used as a stable for horses, and the roof was torn down for use elsewhere. During the Russo-Austrian-Turkish War, from 1736 to 1739, Lazarica was partially reconstructed, and the interior was painted with frescos by Andra Andrejević. After that, Kruševac fell under Ottoman rule again. The first major reconstruction of Lazarica occurred after the establishment of the independent Principality of Serbia, with numerous modifications over the next hundred years.

== Architecture ==
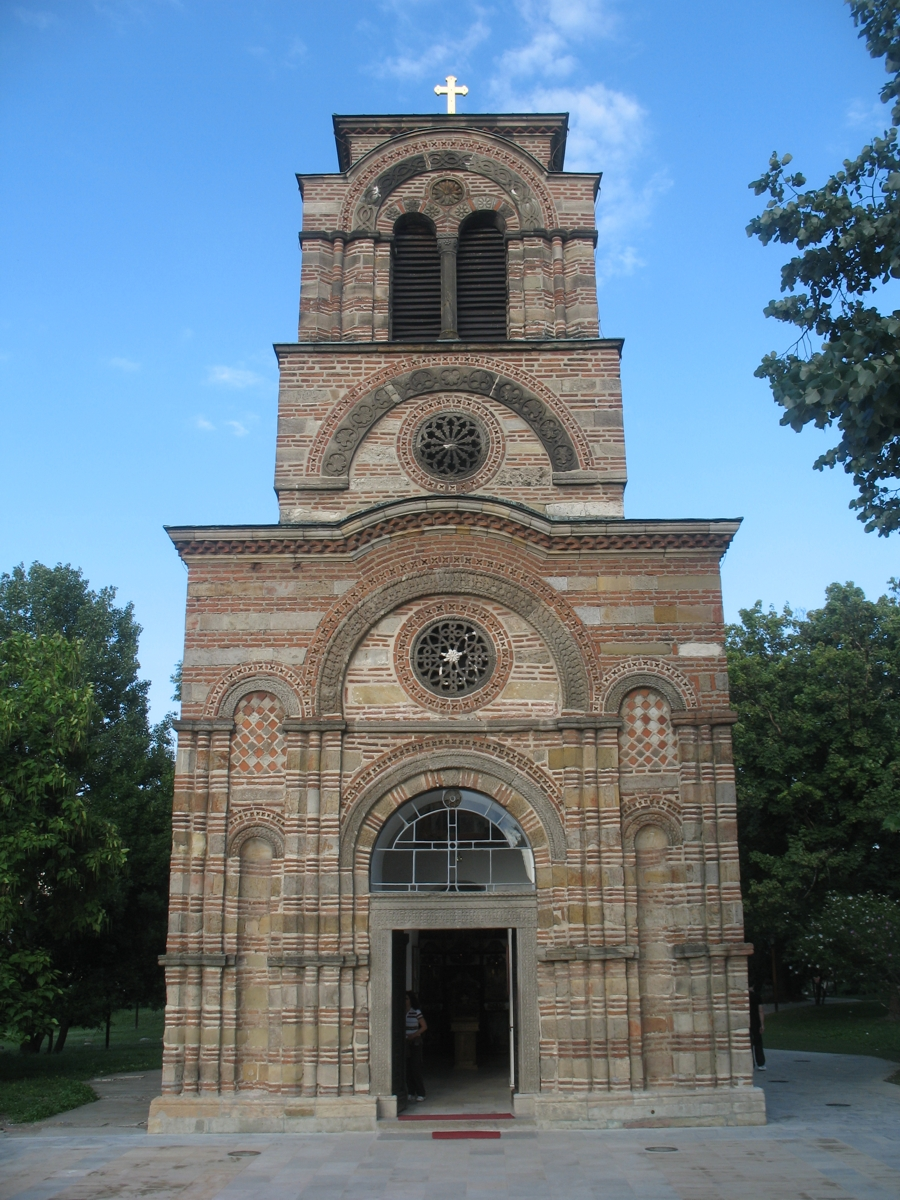
Front of the palace church with details of the rosettes (1375-1378).

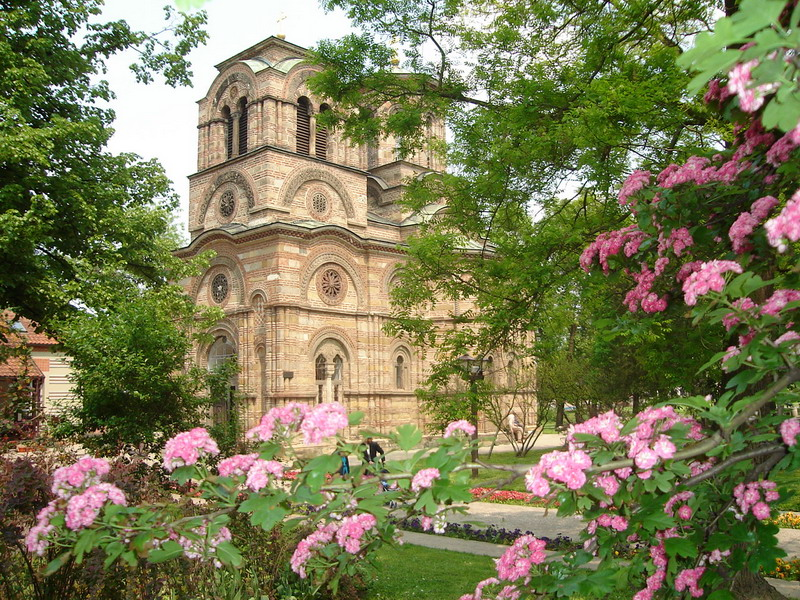
Lazarica Church.

The church is in the form of a trefoil, a variant of the cruciform plan, with three bays in length, a dome over the central area and narthex, originally with open side passages. It has a semicircular apse on the inside, which is five-sided on the outside, with attached colonettes. The church is oriented five degrees from a perfect west–east orientation. The foundation of Lazarica is at an elevation of 159 metres (522 ft). Internal length, from the top of the altar apse to the west wall of the narthex, is 15.65 feet (4.77 m). The western width of the nave is from 5.15 to 5.20 metres (16.9 to 17.1 ft) and the radius of the apse ranges from 1.61 to 1.65 metres (5 ft 3 in to 5 ft 5 in). Internal height to the apex of the semicalotte main dome is 17.25 metres (56.6 ft). Wall thickness ranges from 1 to 1.75 metres (3 ft 3 in to 5 ft 9 in). The foundations were laid at a depth of 0.60 metres (2 ft 0 in).

Lazarica's masonry is basically Byzantine style: continuity of horizontal rows of dressed white sandstone with three rows of brick joints associated with thick plaster, without insisting on randomly placed bricks. A peculiar process was used to draw thick mortar joints out from the wall.

== See also ==
- Ravanica monastery
- Tourism in Serbia
- Cultural Monuments of Rasina District
- Church of St. George, Kruševac
