= Jelena Lazarević =

- Princess of Zeta; Grand Duchess of Hum
- Detail of Tsar Lazar and his family (1860)

Princess Consort of Zeta
- Tenure: 1386–1407
- Predecessor: Comita Muzaka
- Successor: Mara Thopia
- Born: 1365/1366; Fortress of Prilepac near Novo Brdo, Serbian Empire (modern-day Kosovo)
- Died: 1443 (aged 76–77); Beška, Lake Skadar, Serbian Despotate (modern-day Montenegro)
- Spouse: Đurađ II Balšić (m. 1386; died 1403) Sandalj Hranić (m. 1411; died 1435)
- Issue: by Đurađ; Balša III
- House: Lazarević; Nemanjić; Balšić; Kosača
- Father: Lazar of Serbia
- Mother: Milica of Serbia
- Religion: Serbian Orthodoxy
- Occupation: Noble; Writer

Jelena Lazarević (Serbian Cyrillic: Јелена Лазаревић; 1365/1366 – 1443), also known, by marriages, as Jelena Balšić or Jelena Hranić Kosača, was a medieval Serbian princess, daughter of Prince Lazar of Serbia and Princess Milica Nemanjić. She had a very strong personality and significantly influenced the way her husbands, first Đurađ II Balšić and second Sandalj Hranić Kosača, and her son Balša III governed their realms. Jelena encouraged them to resist Venetian encroachment on territory belonging to Zeta, the medieval state ruled by Đurađ II and, upon his death, by Balša III. She is also known as a writer in epistolary literature, particularly her correspondence with Nikon of Jerusalem, a monk in the Gorica Monastery on Lake Skadar (Montenegro). Her three epistles are part of the Gorički zbornik, a medieval manuscript collection.

== Name ==
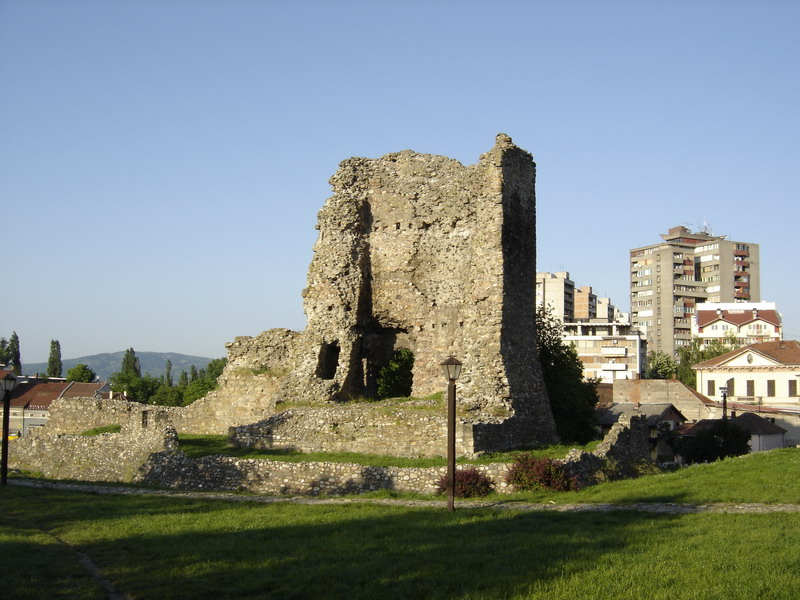
Kruševac Fortress Keep

Jelena's nickname was "Lady Lena" (Госпођа Лена) or the "Learned one" (Учена). In some English sources she is referred to as Helen. She was referred to as Jelena Lazarević because of her father's noble family. Based on her marriage to Đurađ II Balšić she was referred to as Jelena Balšić, while because of her marriage to Sandalj Hranić she was sometimes referred to as Jelena Balšić-Hranić or Jelena Hranić. In a Venetian document from 1409 she is referred to as "Magnifica Domina Elena".

== Life ==
=== Family ===
Jelena was born in 1365 or 1366 as the third daughter of Princess Milica of Serbia and Lazar of Serbia. Her mother belonged to the Nemanjić dynasty, while her father was the founder of the Lazarević dynasty. He created Moravian Serbia, the largest and most powerful state to emerge from the ruins of the Serbian Empire. Hence, Jelena was a member of the highest Serbian aristocracy. She was born in Prilepac and spent her childhood in Kruševac, where she lived until she married her first husband, Đurađ II Balšić, in 1386. She had one child with him, a son named Balša III who was born in 1387. Balša III had three children, a son whose name is not known and two daughters, Jelena and Teodora. His son died at a very young age in 1415. In 1424, Balša's daughter Jelena married Stjepan Vukčić Kosača and became the mother of Queen Catherine of Bosnia and Vladislav Hercegović.

=== Marriage to Đurađ II Balšić ===
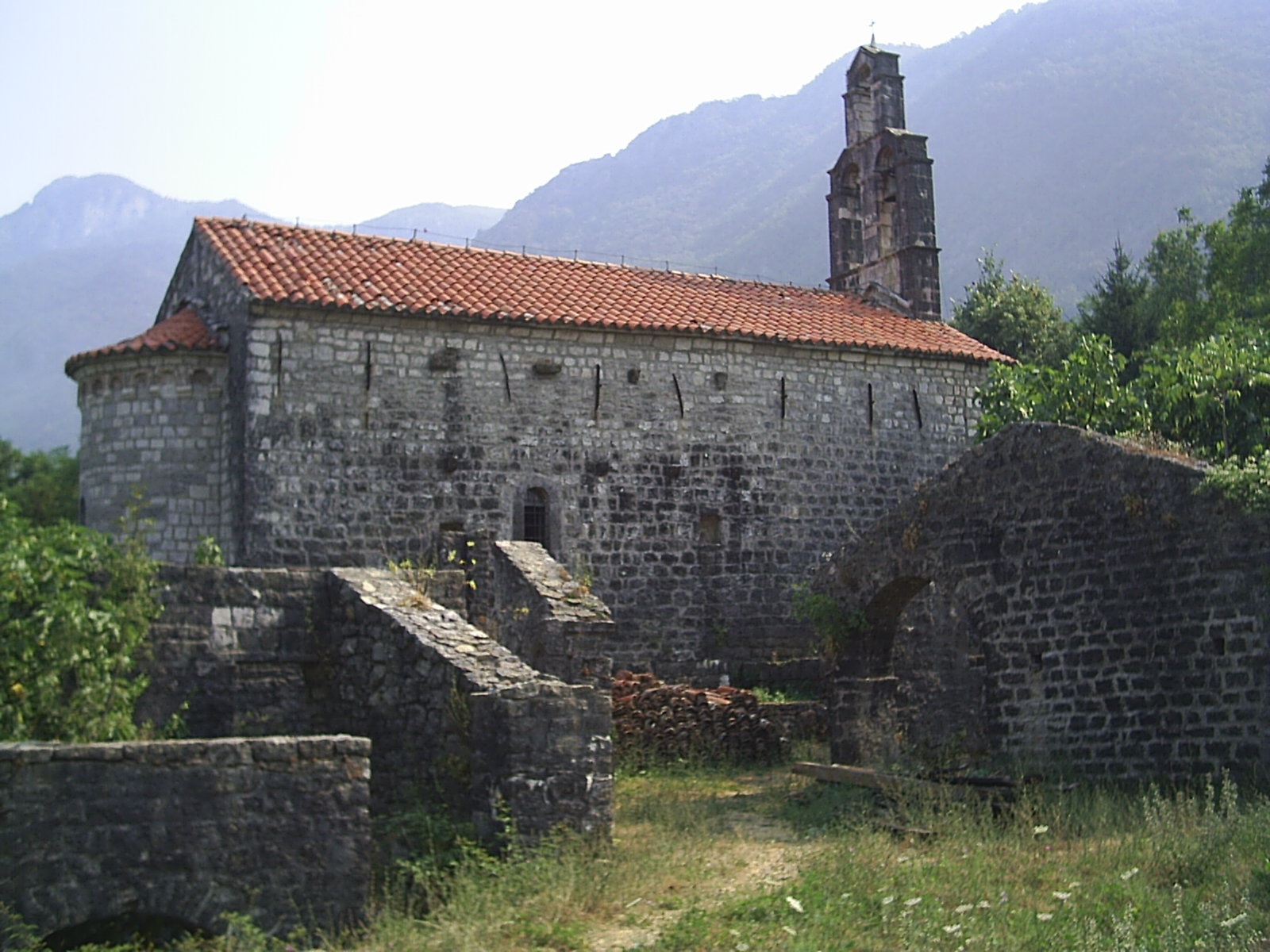
Donji Brčeli Monastery near Bar was founded by Jelena Balšić

Jelena married Đurađ II Balšić in 1386 or 1387. After this marriage the suzerainty of Lazar of Serbia was accepted in most if not all of Zeta. When the Ottoman Sultan Bayezid I sent an army to invade the lands of Đurađ II at the beginning of 1392, Jelena travelled to the Republic of Ragusa (nowadays Dubrovnik) to get out of harm's way. On 1 June 1392, the senate of Dubrovnik decided to send a galley to take her to the city. Đurađ was captured by the Ottomans in October 1392 and was released only once he agreed to cede Scutari to them. He managed to recapture the town in 1395 but subsequently sold it to the Venetians, together with the surrounding fortresses.

Jelena was firmly opposed to the pro-Venetian policy of Đurađ II and his sale of Scutari and other towns to the Venetians. She did not like the Venetians because they obstructed the contacts between the Zetan Orthodox Metropolitanate and the Patriarchate of Peć, cut off Orthodox monasteries around Lake Skadar from the incomes that they were legally entitled to, and engaged in an aggressive trading policy, which significantly reduced Zeta's earnings. Even before the First Scutari War, she was in a dispute with the Venetians over the jurisdiction of the Zetan Orthodox Metropolitanate over the Orthodox churches around the river Bojana and the Church of St. Peter in Scutari. The reign of 16-year-old Balša III began in April 1403 when Đurađ II died of the injuries suffered in November 1402 at the Battle of Tripolje. In this battle Đurađ II supported Stefan Lazarević in an attempt to protect the throne of Serbian Despotate from Đurađ Branković. Jelena had a significant influence on the way Balša III governed Zeta. Because he was a minor when he inherited the throne, she actually governed Zeta as his regent. In a dispute between the Venetians and the Zetan Metropolitan bishop appointed by the Patriarchate of Peć, Balša III followed her instructions and protected the ancient rights of the Serbian church.

=== First Scutari War ===
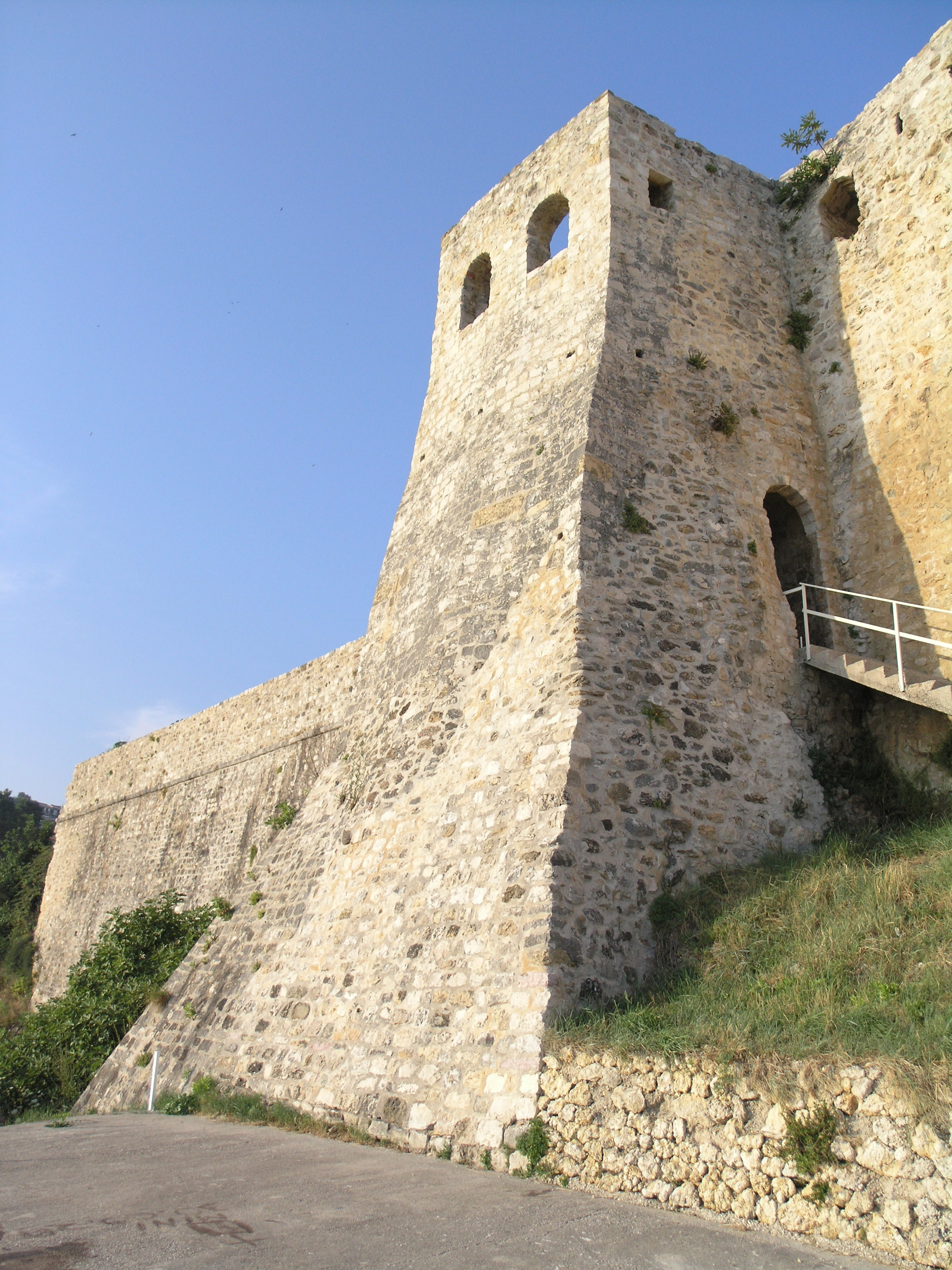
Wall of Ulcinj, the seat of Đurađ II

In 1405, Balša III, supported by Jelena, launched a ten-year war against Venice. At the beginning of the war, Balša managed to capture the whole Scutari region except for the Scutari fortress. The Venetians offered a 2,000-ducat reward for anyone able to kill both Balša and Jelena. When the Venetians in return captured Bar, Ulcinj and Budva, three of the most important ports of Zeta, Balša and Jelena fled from Ulcinj to Drivast Castle.

In 1409, Jelena decided to travel to Venice to negotiate peace in person. At the end of May, she arrived in Dubrovnik but had to wait for almost two months because her hosts warned her that there were Napolitan galleys in the Adriatic Sea. On 9 July 1409, while she was still waiting in Dubrovnik, Venice purchased the entire Dalmatian coast from Ladislaus of Naples for 100,000 ducats. The Kingdom of Naples was not a threat to Venetians anymore. By gaining the Dalmatian coast, the Venetians further increased their influence and power in the region of the Adriatic Sea, which made Jelena's negotiating position difficult. When she finally arrived in Venice at the end of July, she was financially broken because of her long voyage. The Venetians had to support her with three ducats a day during negotiations which lasted for the next three months. On 26 October 1409, a year-long peace agreement with the Venetian doge, Michele Steno, was signed without territorial changes for any of the parties. Jelena traveled back to Zeta through Dubrovnik where she received 100 ducats worth of presents. Although both she and the Venetian representative swore on the Gospel to respect the truce, in reality there was no peace.

=== Marriage to Sandalj Hranić ===
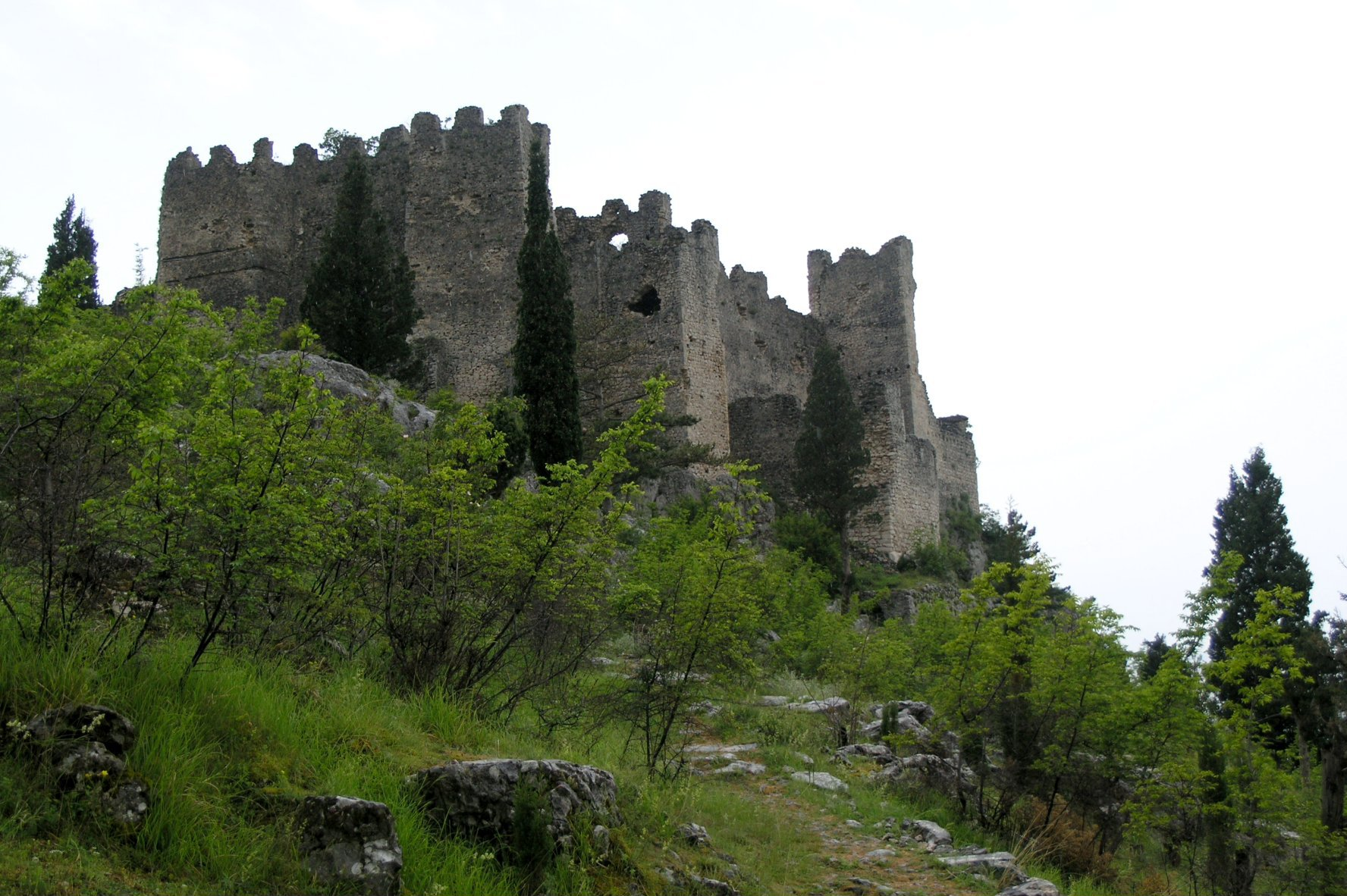
Blagaj, the court of Sandalj Hranić where Jelena went to live after she married him

When Ladislaus of Naples sold his rights to the Kingdom of Dalmatia to the Republic of Venice and retreated from the Balkans in 1409, many local nobles allied themselves with the Holy Roman Emperor Sigismund and accepted Ostoja as the King of Bosnia. This seriously weakened the position of Hrvoje Vukčić Hrvatinić, a Grand Duke of Bosnia, whose niece Katarina was a second wife of Sandalj Hranić, a Grand Duke of Hum. In such circumstances Sandalj decided to ally with emperor Sigismund in mid 1411 and to establish closer connections with Sigismund's important ally Stefan Lazarević. In December 1411 Sandalj divorced his wife Katarina and married Stefan's sister Jelena at the end of the same year. Jelena married Sandalj because she wanted to strengthen the position of her son. With this marriage, Sandalj, the most dangerous enemy of Balša III, became his stepfather and protector. Although it spoiled Sandalj's relations with Hrvoje, it also strengthened traditionally close relations with the Lazarević family. Although Jelena was in her forties, Sandalj hoped they would have children and in 1413 deposited some money at a transactional account with the city of Dubrovnik for the child they would eventually have.

Jelena went to live with her husband at his court in Blagaj in Herzegovina while Balša remained as the only governor of Zeta. In his second marriage, concluded in 1412 or at the beginning of 1413, Balša III married Bolja, a daughter of Koja Zaharia who was a Lord of Sati and Dagnum in Albania. In 1413 Balša issued a charter to the church dedicated to Saint Nicholas he built in Praskvica Monastery together with his mother Jelena.

Sandalj had a court in Novi (modern day Herceg Novi) where he spent some time every year, usually in winter and spring. Beginning in 1424, Jelena spent a good part of the year at this court, accompanied by her sister Olivera.

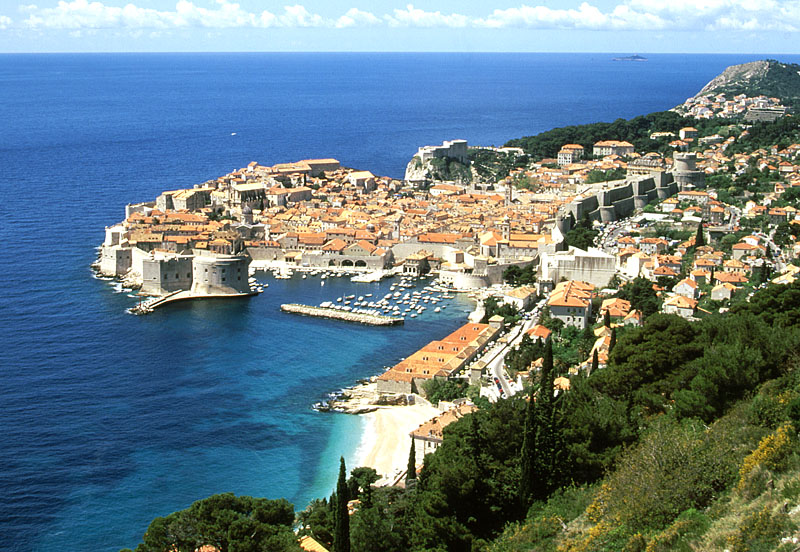
Dubrovnik

At the beginning of February 1426 a special ceremony was dedicated to Jelena and Sandalj in Dubrovnik when they attended the feast of Sveti Vlaho (Saint Blaise), the city's patron saint. Jelena intended to be buried in the church she would build in Dubrovnik. Initially, Dubrovnik was interested in accepting her wish on the condition that she help them take control of Novi, its rival in salt-trading. That is why Dubrovnik proposed to Sandalj to build an Orthodox church and home for old and sick people in 1434. Sandalj died in 1435 before he replied to their proposal. He was succeeded by his nephew Stjepan Vukčić Kosača who was a son of Sandalj's brother Vukac. After Sandalj's death Jelena did not interfere in the governing of the realm previously controlled by her husband but went to live at the seaside, probably in Novi. In September 1435 Jelena asked the Ragusans to allow her to build a church in Dubrovnik in which would be her grave. Since circumstances had changed after Sandalj's death, the Ragusans rejected Jelena's request although it was supported by her nephew, Serbian Despot Đurađ Branković. They justified their refusal with the lack of the approval of the Pope.

=== Gorički zbornik ===
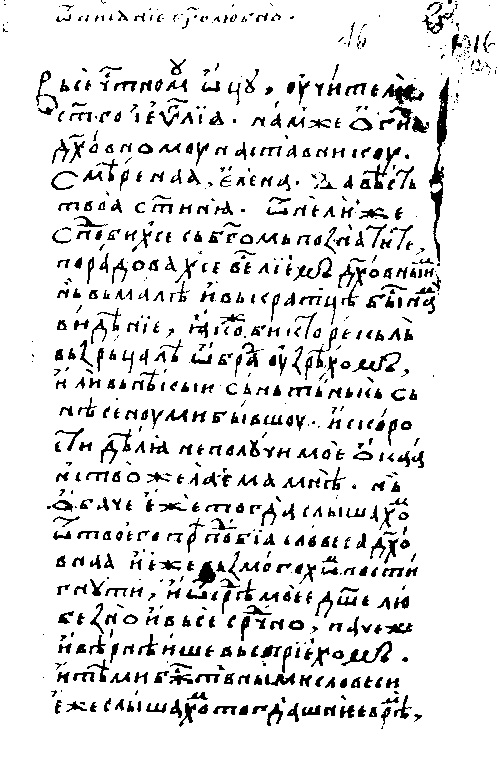
The first page of Otpisanije bogoljubno.

Three epistles she wrote to her spiritual adviser were included in the Gorički zbornik (Serbian: Горички зборник), a medieval manuscript collection. Today only one of them, known as the Otpisanije bogoljubno (Serbian: Отписаније богољубно), is preserved.

Jelena wrote her will on 25 November 1442. Based on its text it can be concluded that she had her own library and that in 1441 she told her chancellor Doberko Marinić to order a book cover. The book cover was made of silver and decorated with the image of Jesus. It was made by Andrija Izat, who was a famous goldsmith from Kotor.

=== Death ===
She first reconstructed the Church of St. George built by Đurađ II Balšić on Beška island on Lake Skadar and in 1439/1440 built as her endowment the Church of Holy Mother next to it. She was buried in its western vault, near the southern wall of the church. The purpose of her endowment was to be her crypt and to serve as the spiritual center which would continue the orientation of the Serbian culture toward Byzantine Orthodox spirituality in this historically last period of Serbian medieval statehood. In this way Jelena confirmed her loyalty to the tradition of the Nemanjić dynasty and her father Prince Lazar in the period when she was able to make a political choice between Islam and militant Catholicism. Jelena's efforts had an additional dimension taking into consideration that her work is a testimony of the presence of the Byzantine hesychasm in the Serbian Despotate.

The sacred bones of Jelena Balšić were placed in the new relic case made of stone after the Church of Holy Mother she built on Beška island was reconstructed in 2002 by the Metropolitanate of Montenegro and the Littoral. By the decision of the 'Metropolitanate of Montenegro and the Littoral' in 2006 she was titled 'Blagovjerna' and named "Blagovjerna Jelena Lazareva Balšić".

== Legacy ==
Jelena Balšić has been praised for preserving the power of the Balšić family during a turbulent period. She managed to maintain the cultural heritage of the Kingdom of Serbia, and her writing has been evaluated.

The literature award "Jelena Balšić" was established in 2007 by the 'Metropolitanate of Montenegro and the Littoral' and is awarded every two years. As of 2013, its laureates have been Đorđe Sladoje, Žarko Komanin, Ranko Jovović and Slobodan Rakitić.

=== Folk Legends ===
Legends say that she was Jelena Obilić, a widow of Miloš Obilić. One of the legends about Jelena was recorded in Herzegovina. According to that legend Sandalj asked Jelena who was her favorite husband. Her reply was that she would give away both Sandalj and Balšić just to see Miloš Obilić one more time. Sandalj was angered and Jelena had to run away from him. While she was on the way to Zeta, in some nettle, she gave birth to a boy who was a founder of Koprivica family (kopriva, "nettle").

Some of the preserved legends about Jelena include Queen Jelena's Bees (Пчеле краљице Јелене/Pčele kraljice Jelene), Queen Jelena's Fishpond (Рибњак краљице Јелене/Ribnjak kraljice Jelene), White Stone (Вијели кам/Bijeli kam) and Queen Jelena's Mowers (Косци краљице Јелене/Kosci kraljice Jelene).

== See also ==
- Jefimija
- Maria Angelina Doukaina Palaiologina
- Princess Milica of Serbia
- Mara Branković
- Olivera Despina
- Saint Angelina of Serbia
- Saint Helen of Serbia
- Simonida
- Kassia
- Anna Komnene
