= Pribac Hrebeljanović =

Logothete Pribac Hrebeljanović Pribac Hrebeljanović
- Logothete of the Serbian empire
- Predecessor: Hrebljan Stojić
- Successor: Lazar Hrebeljanović
- Born: c. 1300; Kosovo, Kingdom of Serbia (medieval)
- Died: June 1362; Kosovo, Serbian Empire
- Burial: Gračanica Monastery
- Spouse: Daughter of Novak
- Issue: Lazar of Serbia and Dragana Hrebeljanović
Names
- Pribac Hrebeljanović
- House: Hrebeljanović
- Father: Hrebljan Stojić
- Religion: Serbian Orthodox Christian

Pribac Hrebeljanović (Serbian: Прибац Хребељановић (c. 1300 – 1362) was a Serbian Logothete and a part of the Serbian nobility or Vlastela. He held the lands of Prilepac and Prizrenac. During the formation of the Serbian Empire many Serb nobles gained higher titles and more land, however Pribac was not offered this. Pribac played a big role in getting his son Lazar of Serbia to the title he bared during the fall of the Serbian empire.

== Life on the Serbian throne ==
He was born around 1300, to an influential merchant Hrebljan, who came to prominence in the army of Stefan Milutin. Hrebljan became rich and likely became a minor noble, governor of Stalać, a wealthy and large city at the time. Pribac likely served in the army as well, as he is listed as a commander of 1000 soldiers in Dečani edict of 1330, and fought in battle of Velbazhd and capture of Prilep and Ohrid. During Dušan Nemanjić's revolts against his father Stephen of Dečani, Pribac gave Dušan full support and was given the title of Logothete and given lands in Kosovo. Pribac wasn't a very rich noble but not a small one either and mostly organized royal feasts, weddings and meetings, and may have become royal chancellor. He died in 1362 in Ferizaj, Kosovo. He had two sons, one unknown, and second was Lazar of Serbia, future ruler of Moravian Serbia who fought the Ottomans at The Battle of Kosovo in 1389. He is mentioned as logothete on Dušan's charter in 1343.
