= Beška (disambiguation) =

Beška is a village in Serbia.

Beška may also refer to:

- Beška (island), an island in Skadar Lake in the Montenegrin municipality of Podgorica
- Beška Monastery, a medieval Serbian Orthodox monastery on the island in Montenegro
- Beška Bridge, a concrete highroad bridge on the Danube river near Beška, Serbia

== See also ==
- Beshka, a river in central Ukraine
