= Đurađ II Balšić =

Member of the Balšić noble family

Đurađ II Balšić Ђурађ II Балшић Gjergj II Balsha
- Lord of Zeta and the Coast
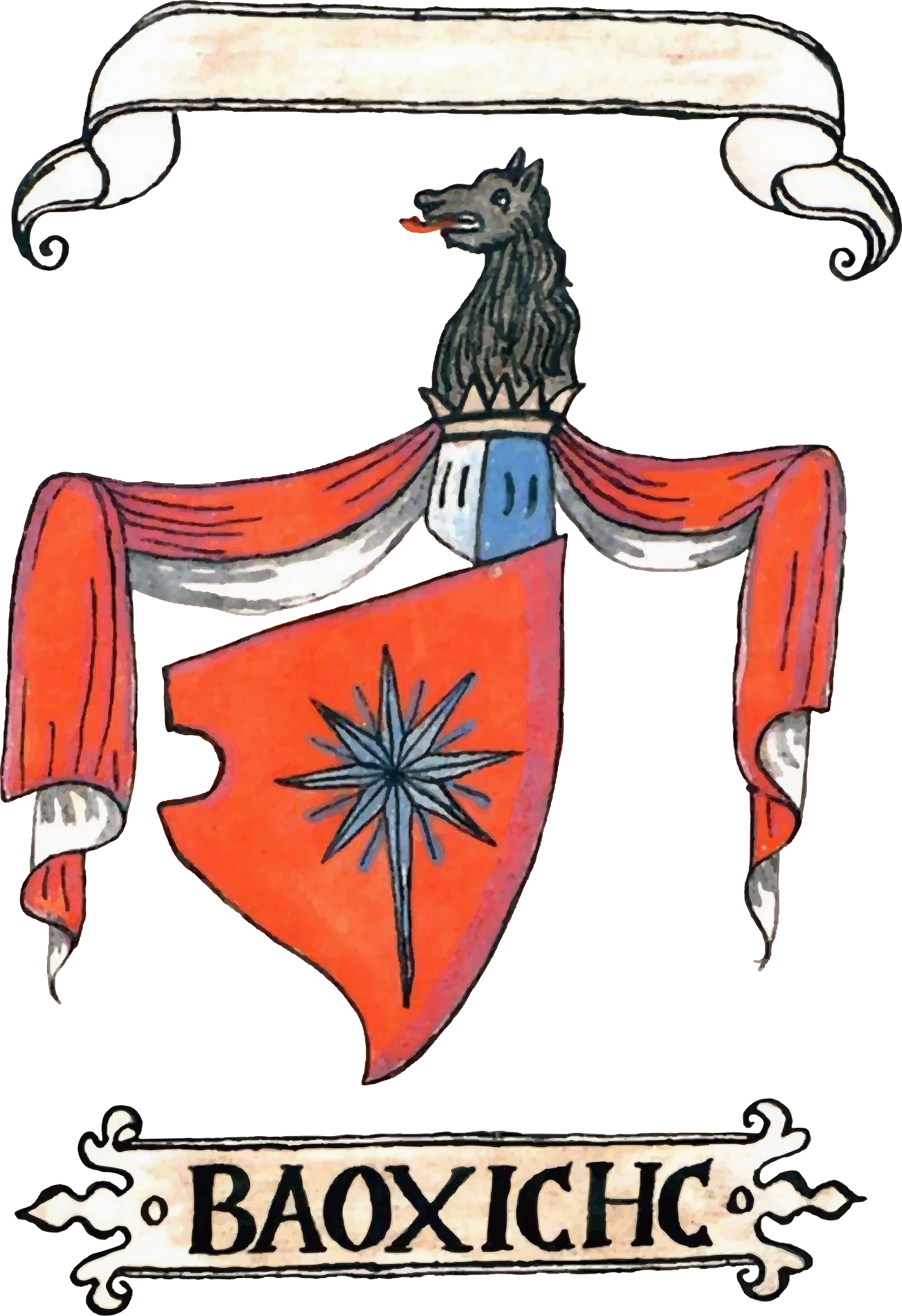
- Coat of arms of the Balšić family

Lord of Zeta and the Coast
- Reign: September 18th, 1385 – April 1403
- Predecessor: Balša II
- Successor: Balša III
- Died: April 1403; Ulcinj
- Burial: Church of St. Catherine, Ulcinj
- Spouse: Jelena Lazarević
- Issue: Balša III
- House: Balšić
- Father: Stracimir Balšić
- Mother: Milica Mrnjavčević

Đurađ II Balšić (Serbian Cyrillic: Ђурађ II Балшић; Albanian: Gjergj II Balsha) or George II Balsha fl. 1385 – April 1403), was the Lord of Zeta from 1385 to 1403, as a member of the Balšić noble family. He was the son of Stracimir Balšić, and succeeded his paternal uncle Balša II in ruling Zeta. He reigned from 1386 up to 1389 in the still officially undissolved Serbian Empire in the form of a family alliance, then up to 1395 as an Ottoman vassal. He ruled until his death in 1403, when he was succeeded by his only son, Balša III. According to some historians, Serbian epic poetry identifies Đurađ II with Strahinja Banović.

== Background and early life ==
His father was Stracimir, one of the three Balšić brothers who came to rule Zeta in the 1360s. His mother was Princess Milica Mrnjavčević (Jerina), the daughter of Serbian King and co-ruler of Uroš V, Vukašin Mrnjavčević.

=== Accession ===
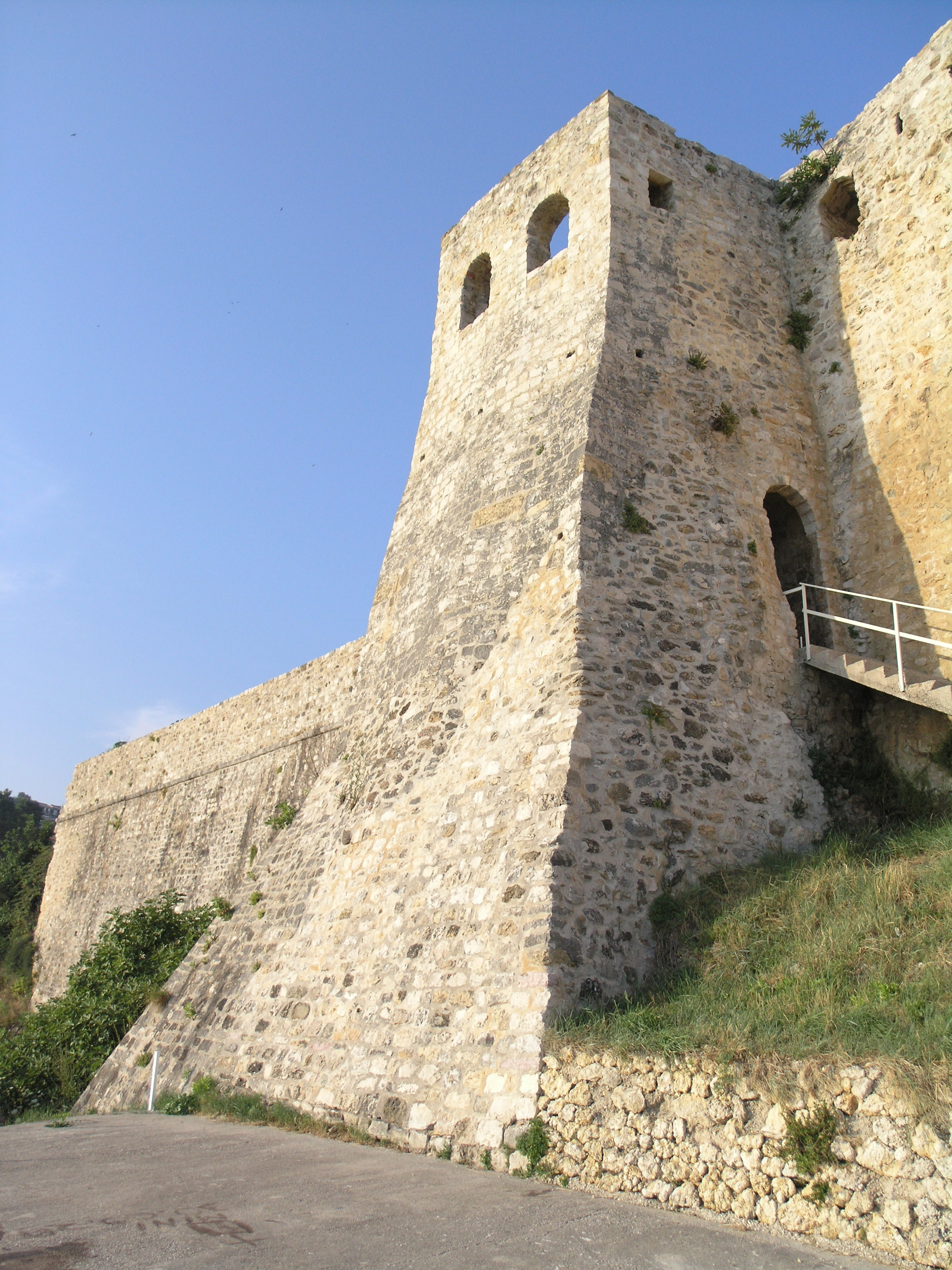
Ulcinj Fortress of Đurađ II

On 18 September 1385, Đurađ's uncle Balša II was killed at the Battle of Savra, while fighting the Ottomans. Following the temporary rule under Balša II's widow Comita and daughter Ruđina, Đurađ II inherited parts of Zeta and northern Albania, including the cities of Scutari, Drivast and Lezhë, as per the Balšićs' traditional rule of seniority, as "self-holder to the Zeta and Coast land". Đurađ II had his seat at Ulcinj, which also became the family seat. The remainder of the Balšić possessions, in southern Albania, passed in 1396 from Ruđina to her spouse Mrkša Žarković, the son of Žarko, Emperor Dušan's nobleman. The protovestijar Philip Bareli, the Venetian trader that handled Balša's financing, who was succeeded by Đurađ, is also mentioned as holding estates.

According to Mavro Orbini, when Đurađ II started his rule, "the tribes of Upper Zeta and the Crnojević did not want to recognize him, answering that they were under the Bosnian King Tvrtko".

Đurađ had succeeded leadership in the heats of disarray. Pal Dukagjini broke off allegiance to Đurađ, taking Lezhë and the Drin area. Finally the Jonima family seceded with their own lands between Durrës and the Drin, causing Đurađ to lose his very last possessions in Albania. Before even consolidating rule, Karlo Thopia conquered Durrës and assigned it to his son George, Nikola Sakat, the castellan of Budva, and his brother Andrija seceded the city after 1386 and Vuk Branković took Peć and Prizren. Đurađ asked Dukagjini for an advice, and according to it, he had the Sakat brothers imprisoned and blinded. In the Zeta plains themselves under Lovćen, Đurađ had constant conflicts with the opposing ruler of Upper Zeta, Radič Crnojević, whose family had just come to prominence. The area of Onogošt (Nikšić) seceded to the Venetians. In a short time, Đurađ's demesne had diminished into a small strip of land between Lake Skadar and the Adriatic Sea. Upon proclaiming himself the sole head of the Balšić family, he issued an official edict on 28 January 1386 in Scutari, calling his reign's strength upon "..the prayers and martyrs of my holy forefathers Symeon, the Nemanya, the first Serbian Myhrr-flowing, and Sava the Saint" of his kin. In it he also stated that the laws of the Serbian lords, his predecessors Stracimir, Đurađ and Balša, and in specific of Emperor Dušan, shall remain and be valid for his reign. It was a standard remark of the ruler's calling upon divine right and inspired by the heritage of the Serbian Medieval state, now in feudal disarray. Mladen Ilić, logotet Butko and vojvoda Nikola were witnesses in the edict.

=== Serbian alliance ===
From the start of his reign, Đurađ faced the potential threat from the powerful expansionist Ottoman Empire. To strengthen political links, he married Jelena Lazarević (b. 1368), daughter of the Serbian Moravian lord Lazar Hrebeljanović, after recognizing Lazar as his sovereign in 1386. The folklore has recorded that Đurađ was at war with Prince Lazar for three times before a peaceful union was achieved, although there is no historical confirmation. Prince Lazar aimed at maintaining the heritage of the dispersing Serbian Empire. Đurađ, Lazar, and Lord Vuk Branković of Kosovo formed a family alliance to govern the renewed Serbian realm, presided over by Lazar. The three also shared the annual tax paid to Serbian lords by the Republic of Ragusa. Each member retained some autonomy, however, as can be seen through Đurađ's styling of himself as "I, Balšić in Christ the Lord, Đurađ, pious and autocratic lord of the lands of Zeta and the coast." Edicts for the realm were issued commonly by all three lords, extending Serbia to some form of a level of a Triarchy, or even Diarchy, considering Vuk's considerably subordinate status to Lazar.

Đurađ also maintained diplomatic relations with the Ottoman Empire. Đurađ owes his position and everlasting presence on the scene to his political cunningness. He succeeded the traditional rivalry between his family and Bosnian-Serbian King Tvrtko I Kotromanić, whose Serbian crown the Balšićs did not recognize, most probably because of their own claims to the Serbian throne. On his diplomatic initiative, the Ottomans invaded Bosnia in 1386. During a second attack, Đurađ even sent his own troops to support the Ottoman Beylerbey of Rumelia Lala Şâhin Paşa at the Battle of Bileća on 27 August 1388, where he suffered a defeat to the hands of Bosnian Duke Vlatko Vuković Kosača. This led to the suspicion that Đurađ was an Ottoman vassal. The Ragusan Republic was weary of this Ottoman expansion, so they wanted to negotiate with Đurađ some military protection. On 23 August 1388 Đurađ sent his envoy Žanin Bareli, Filip's son.

Legends record Đurađ running with his forces to join the Serbian allied forces at the 1389 Battle of Kosovo and returning after he heard the news about the fall; however this is very improbable if his links to the Ottomans in that period are accounted for. The Epic telling records "Baoš" coming late on the 3rd day to the Kosovo Field after the battle and how he was furious at the alleged traitor "Duke Vukan Branković". Also the wrong daughter of "Emperor Lazar", Olivera Despina, was remembered as married to Đurađ. Most historians and scholars identify him as the Serbian Epic hero Banović Strahinja, due to the close similarities in name and characteristics. In any case, after the Battle of Kosovo, the Serbian Alliance crumbled and the last remains of the Serbian Empire dispersed, leaving Đurađ completely on his own.

=== Zeta on its own ===
In 1390 Vuk Branković sent envoys to Zeta and offered 500 liters of silver to Philip Bareli to hand over last Đurađ's bastion, the City of Ulcinj. Fearing the occasion, Đurađ had him immediately imprisoned together with his children.

During his rule, Đurađ, like his predecessors, tried to find an effective modus vivendi for extending his rule over the City of Kotor. As the richest and most economically developed city on the southern Adriatic coast close to Zeta, it fueled the rivalry between King Tvrtko and Đurađ. For these reasons no friendship between the two was created, even after peaceful relations were concluded in early 1389 on mediation of the Republic of Ragusa. When Tvrtko died in the beginning of March 1391, the opportunity arose for Đurađ and he subsequently seized Kotor.

From the start of Đurađ's reign he had to face with the outlaw of his cousin Konstantin, administrator of the lands in the rivers of Bojana and Drin, who didn't accept his supremacy in the Balšićs' lands. It is believed that Filip Bareli had connections with Konstantin, so he was convicted for committing the highest felony, a "crime against Đurađ's authority" and all of his plentiful property was confiscated by Đurađ. Konstantin went into Ottoman service and since 1390 under protection of Sultan Bayezid I actively worked to seize power as the Head Balšić. As a result, Đurađ came into fierce opposition to the Ottomans in 1391, converted to Catholicism from Serbian Orthodoxy, and promised his lands in heritage to Pope Boniface IX in the case of no heir apparent. Clearly siding with the Christian coalition under the legal Papal States in conflict with the Avignonese Antipope Clement VII, Đurađ took the side of Louis II of Anjou in his war against Ladislaus of Naples. But the broader plans for organizing a crusade against Turks have remained but a dream.

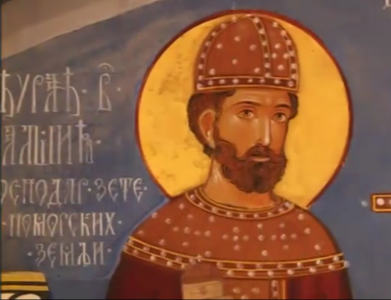
Fresco of Đurađ II Balšić

Đurađ received a border with the Ottoman Empire as they took the lands of Vuk Branković in 1392. For opposition to Turkish influence in the region, the Sultan sent an army to invade his lands in May 1392. At the same time in the heat of fighting his competitors Radič Crnojević and Konstantin Balšić, Đurađ was forced to negotiate with the Ottomans for peace terms. In order to protect his wife Jelena from the Ottoman danger Đurađ decided to send her to Dubrovnik in June 1392. He negotiated with Pasha Yiğit Bey, sanjakbey of the Sanjak of Skopje, but the talks were fruitless as the Ottoman demanded half of all his territories around Zeta, including his seat of Ulcinj. In addition to that, in late 1392 the bey managed to capture Đurađ in a battle and released him only after the ransom was paid. When Đurađ was in captivity Radič Crnojević captured his lands around Kotor and proclaimed himself Lord of Zeta and Budva. His wife Jelena Lazarević was making moves to free him, with the help of the Venetian Republic, but they all reached a moot end. One of the main reasons for that was that his opponent Radič Crnojević expanded his reign vastly and became a Venetian vassal in November 1392. The possibility of this was Đurađ's reluctance to release Philip Bareli, a Venetian citizen, despite many pleas from the Republic. In the heat of struggle amongst feudal lords in Zeta, Philip managed in 1392 to flee from his prison to Durrës, coming into John Thopia's service. On the other side King Stjepan Dabiša dispatched Bosnian Duke Sandalj Hranić from the Hum to take over Đurađ's lands and further agitate Radič Crnojević.

Having no other choice, Đurađ handed over to bey Şâhin the cities of Scutari and Drivast and the Forum of Sveti Srđ on the Bojana River to the Turks, as well as agreed to pay annual taxes in exchange for his release. Ottoman squadrons occupied the locations in early 1393. The same year he tried to claim his old Lezhë which was just handed over by the Dukagjinis to the Venetians, but Radič's support of Venetian control proved crucial. Seeing the necessity of Venetian support, he managed to get accepted into its citizenry in May 1395. Đurađ did not rest for long, and already in October 1395 he broke the deal while the Ottomans were at war against the Hungarians and Wallachians, restored Scutari and Sveti Srđ and even defeated his rival Konstantin by seizing his stronghold of Danj, with Venetian assistance. To keep his cities safe, Đurađ relied upon the rivalry between Turkey and Venice. He handed over the cities into Venetian administration. When Ottoman advances obviously came to a halt, the Venetians decided to negotiate the deal. In April 1396 a contract was signed. Đurađ handed over Scutari, the Skadar Lake with all its islands and Sveti Srđ to Venetian administration, as well as agreed to channel the income from tolls in Danj, in exchange for 1,000 ducats every year. He also promised to give the cities support in case of a Turkish attack and was accepted into Venetian nobility. The whole act was typical for weak lords facing the mighty Ottoman Empire in the coastline of the western Balkans. Đurađ remained to rule directly just a small territory west of the Bojana river with Bar and Ulcinj as the only cities.

In 1396 Koja Zakarija from the Sakat family came to power in northern Albania centered in Danj, independently from Đurađ.

=== Zeta's rebirth ===
At the end of April 1396, Radič and his brother Dobrivoje Crnojević had made a significant move against Đurađ. They took Grbalj and laid siege to Kotor. Đurađ became disliked by the Orthodox Serb commonfolk, so the excessively Orthodox religious Crnojevićs' takeover was looked upon nicely by the people, resulting in Paštrovićs' cross to Radič's side. In May 1396 they moved to battle Đurađ himself, however Đurađ completely defeated the Crnojevićs and killed Radič, managing to get a hold over a part of the Crnojević domain. Soon a new enemy arose at the west; Bosnian nobleman Sandalj Hranić Kosača seized large parts of land quickly and conquered Budva and Kotor, made a deal with the Paštrovićs, also managing to win Venetian protection, who proclaimed him the legitimate ruler of Budva and Zeta itself. In Upper Zeta the Đurašević subgroup of the Crnojevićs came to prominence, though they made an agreement and joined Đurađ, seeing a common enemy in Duke Sandalj. They aided him in the wars against Sandalj, taking the first fronts by retaking all the lands from Budva to Spič as well as the Churchland of Saint Miholj in the Bay of Kotor, the Serbian Orthodox religious center in Zeta. On 25 September 1396, the Hungarian King Sigismund lost the Battle of Nicopolis. During his return across the sea, he stayed in Đurađ's lands. To honor Đurađ for his fights against the Ottomans, Sigismund made him Prince of his Dalmatian islands of Hvar and Korčula.

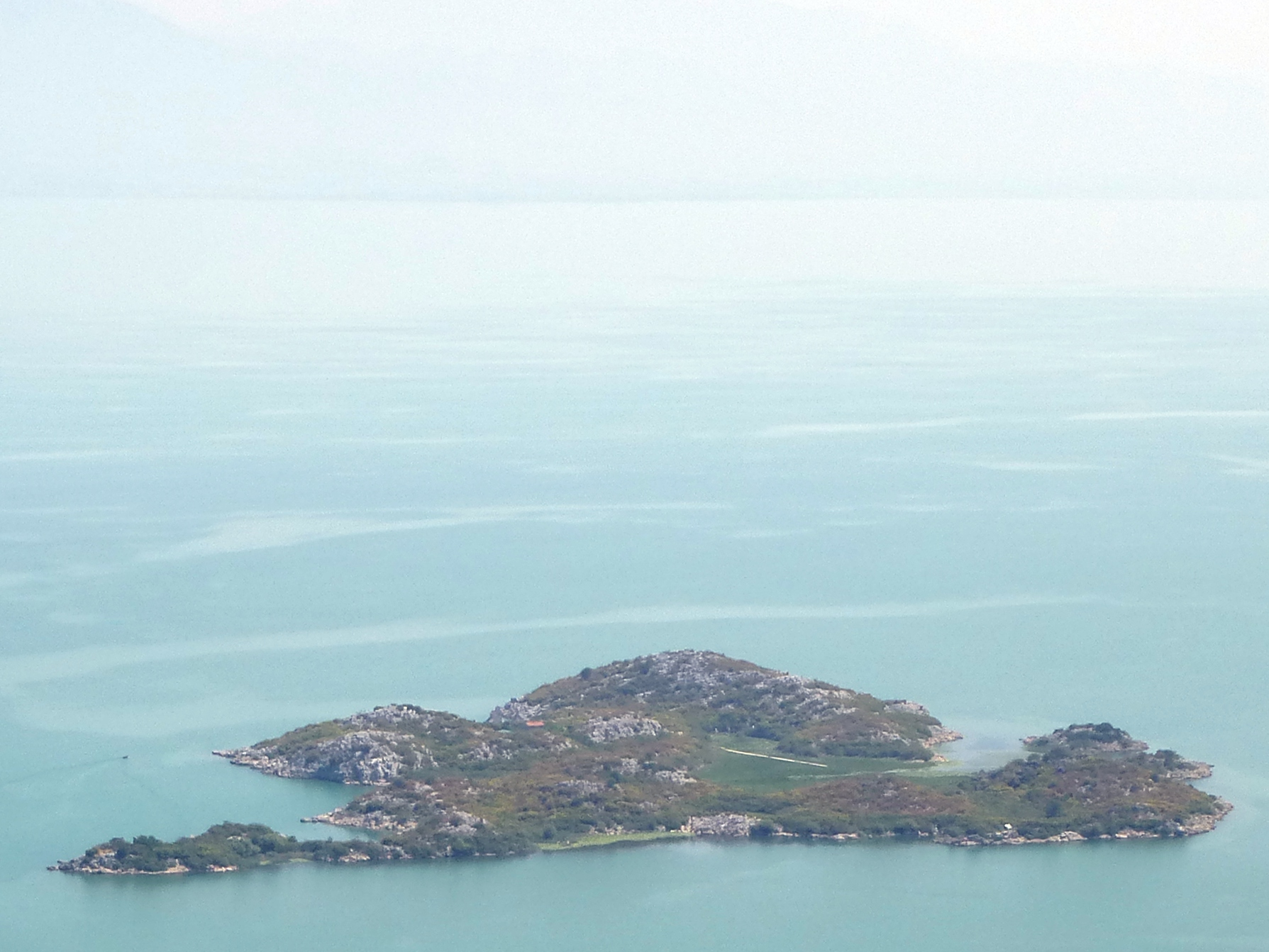
The Beška island on Lake Skadar, where Balšić founded the monastery

The Most Serene Republic of Venice led an economic policy that soon introduced Venetian monetary domination in the region, fully replacing that of the Balšićs', and ever since Spring 1396 clearly showed pretensions to take the remaining lands of Đurađ. The Venetian monopoly introduced by lowering customs and other taxes in Scutari and Drivast greatly diminished the Balšićs' income so the relations between the two deteriorated. It is so that in 1399 when in the Venetian-administered Balšić lands the oppressed peasants raised a rebellion, all the guilt was attributed to Đurađ. As a result, in early 1401 Venice ceased paying the annual thousand ducat tribute for the lands. Another reason claimed were the frequent robberies by suspects from Đurađ's domain of Venetian storehouses of salt in the region, a crucial resource in that time. This caused Đurađ to renew links with the Ottoman Turks again, but wars in Asia Minor have made them impossible to intervene, which finally forced Đurađ to succumb to Venetian demands. As per the new deal, he paid for all the damage done by the robbers and agreed to give free passage and special privileges to Venetian traders, while Venice continued to pay the tribute for the cities. These acts introduced Venetian presence in the region, which would henceforth remain as an important local political factor. In 1402 his long-term Balšić rival Konstantin was killed by Venetian agents in Dyrrhachium under unknown circumstances.

Returning from the Battle of Angora, Đurađ's brother-in-law, the newly crowned Despot Stefan Lazarević, stayed at his court in the late Summer of 1402. Đurađ prepared him and organized an army to battle his rival Đurađ Branković in Ottoman service at the Battle of Tripolje near Gračanica in November 1402, to help his cousin with all means possible, ending in full victory. In April 1403, Đurađ II Stracimirović died of the injuries suffered in the battle. He was buried in the Church of Saint Catherine in his hometown of Ulcinj, where he still remains. Seventeen-year-old Balša, Đurađ II's only child, inherited his lands. He ruled with his mother as Chief adviser until she remarried in 1411, to Bosnian Duke Sandalj Hranić from Herzegovina. She gave a significant impact to Zetan foreign policy, tying it strongly with the newly created Serbian Despotate as a former important part of the Empire.

== Miscellaneous ==
Đurađ continued using the currency of his predecessors, coins forged with the wolf, chest, and shield symbols of the Balšićs, Dinars, used in the lands of the Serbian Empire, though he didn't mint many new coins, similar to his predecessor, due to continuous weakening of the Balšićs' economic power. One of the two versions featured heads of wolves and the Balšićs' coat of arms, each with a surrounding inscription: "M.D. GORGI STRACIMIR" on one side, and "S.STEFAN SCUTARI" on the other. The other version had the character "M" next to the coat of arms and the presentations of Balšićs' patron Saint Lawrence along with an inscription below him "S LAVRENCIUS M". According to some sources, he also issued several coins inscribed in Cyrillic; however, later sources attribute these to Đurađ I Balšić.

Đurađ founded for the Serbian Orthodox Church a Church of Saint George and the Beška Monastery on the island of Beška in Lake Skadar, near Starčevo. After his death, his wife Jelena Lazarević expanded it in 1438/1439 with another church, the St Mary's Church, where she was buried in 1443. The monastery became a significant cultural and spiritual center of the Serbian Church, actively working in scribing and nourishing the Nemanjić heritage. Đurađ's wife Jelena became a deeply religious and talented poet, writing the opus of then's Old Serb-Slavic language.

== Title ==
- "Lord of All Zetan and Maritime Lands", 1386
- "Lord of Zeta" (signor de Zenta), charter dated 28 February 1388.
- "Albanian lord" (arbanaški gospodin), in Life of Despot Stefan Lazarević authored by Constantine of Kostenets c. 1431

== Annotations ==
1. Name: His full name has been written as Đurađ Stracimirović Balšić (Ђурађ Страцимировић Балшић). He is more commonly known as Đurađ Stracimirović (Ђурађ Страцимировић), than either Đurađ II Stracimirović (Ђурађ II Страцимировић) or Đurađ II Balšić (Ђурађ II Балшић). His name is scarcely anglicized, as George II.

== Sources ==
- Fajfrić, Željko (2000) [1998], Sveta loza Stefana Nemanje, Belgrade: Tehnologije, izdavastvo, agencija Janus
- Fine, John Van Antwerp (1994). The Late Medieval Balkans: A Critical Survey from the Late Twelfth Century to the Ottoman Conquest. Michigan: The University of Michigan Press. ISBN 0-472-08260-4.
- Malcolm, Noel (1998). Kosovo: a short history. Macmillan. ISBN 978-0-333-66612-8.
- Veselinović, Andrija & Ljušić, Radoš (2008). "Балшићи" Srpske dinastije. Službene glasink. ISBN 9788675499213.

Đurađ II Balšić Balšić noble family Born: ? Died: 1403
Preceded by Balša II	Lord of Zeta; 1386–1403	Succeeded by Balša III
