= List of fortifications in Kosovo =

This page is list of forts and fort ruins in Kosovo.

- Dardana Fortress in Kamenicë
- Duboc Fortress in Vushtrri
- Harilaq Fortress in Kosovo Polje
- Korisha Fortress in Prizren
- Lipa Castle in Pejë
- Novo Brdo Fortress in Pristina
- Pogragja Fortress in Gjilan
- Prilepac in Pristina
- Prizren Fortress in Prizren
- Prizrenac in Pristina
- Vuçak Fortress in Drenas
- Vushtrri Castle in Mitrovicë
- Zatrič in Rahovec
- Zvečan Fortress in Mitrovicë

== See also ==
- List of forts
