= Gorički zbornik =

- Serbian Academy of Sciences and Arts as legacy of Svetozar Tomić
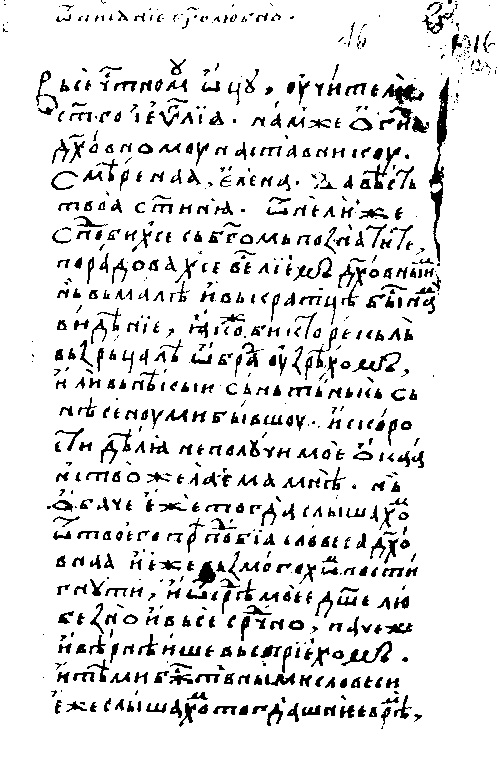
- A page from Gorički zbornik
- Also known as: Gorica's Almanac; Manuscript of Gorica; Gorica Miscellany
- Date: 1441 — 1442
- Place of origin: Gorica island on Skadar Lake, Serbian Despotate
- Language(s): Serbo-slavic language
- Author(s): Jelena Lazarević, Nikon of Jerusalem
- Material: Paper
- Size: 273 pages of 21 cm x 14 cm
- Condition: Wooden covers coated with leather, some pages are cropped and inexpertly "restored", badly damaged and even missing
- Discovered: In 1902 by Svetozar Tomić who bought it in Skopje (modern-day North Macedonia, then Ottoman Empire)

The Gorički zbornik (Serbian Cyrillic: Горички зборник) or the Gorica's Almanac or Gorica Miscellany or the Manuscript of Gorica is a Serbian medieval manuscript collection written by Jelena Lazarević and monk Nikon of Jerusalem in 1441 and 1442 in the church Jelena built on the island Gorica on Skadar Lake. Its name is derived from the name of the church.

== Contents ==
The first part of Gorički zbornik contains a correspondence between Jelena Lazarević and her spiritual adviser Nikon of Jeruzalem. Jelena wrote three epistles to Nikon who replied to her presenting a position of the church regarding different theological issues. Only one of three epistles, known as Otpisanije bogoljubno (Serbian: Отписаније богољубно), is preserved today. The correspondence between Jelena and her spiritual adviser has its origin in a common practice in Byzantium. Scholars praised this epistle although its part was the same as hagiography of John of Rila written by Evtimiy of Tarnovo. Similarity of the medieval texts written on the Balkans corresponds with Byzantine practice and genre principle which was based on the universal and common forms, not on the individual ones.

In the second part of Gorički zbornik Nikon writes to Jelena about her ancestors using Serbian genealogies and annals as well as hagiography of Saint Simeon written by Stefan the First-Crowned and the hagiography of Saint Sava written by Teodosije.

The next part is the monastic constitution, composed on Jelena's order, to be used in the church she built on the Gorica island. A 'Tale of Jerusalem Churches and Places in the Desert' (Serbian: Повест о јерусалимских црквама и местима у пустињи) is the next part of the zbornik followed by the preaching of the faith, begging for forgiveness if there are mistakes in the manuscripts and greetings. The last part of the zbornik is Jelena's letter where she confirms that she received work of her spiritual adviser Nikon as gift which she donate to the church at Gorica.

One of the reasons why the Gorički zbornik is very important in the literature of medieval Zeta is that it is a testimony of presence and establishment of the Byzantine hesychasm on the territory which was under direct pressure of Latin Venetian policy.

== Covers ==
Jelena wrote her will on 25 November 1442 which shows that she had her own library and that in 1441 based on her instructions her chancellor Doberko ordered a book covers made of silver and decorated with image of Jesus from a goldsmith from Kotor named Andrija. It may be assumed that this covers were made for Gorički zbornik although it was later discovered within wooden/leather covers.

== Nikon of Jerusalem ==
Nikon changed his name to Nikandar of Jerusalem after he undertook greater monastic duties. Besides Gorički zbornik Nikon wrote another manuscript collection known as Šestodnev in 1439/1440 which is preserved in Savina Monastery.

== Sources ==
- Bešić, Zarij M. (1970), Istorija Crne Gore / 2. Crna gora u doba oblasnih gospodara. (in Serbian), Titograd: Redakcija za istoiju Crne Gore, OCLC 175122851
- Bogdanović, Dimitrije (1970), Gorički zbornik (PDF) (in Serbian), Cetinje: Metropolitanate of Montenegro and the Littoral, archived from the original (PDF) on 2015-04-16
- Tomin, Svetlana (September 2000), Otpisanije bogoljubno Jelene Balšić: Prilog shvatanju autorskog načela u srednjevekovnoj književnosti (PDF) (in Serbian), Cetinje: International scientific symposium "Nikon of Jeruzalem: time — personality — work"
- Spremić, Momčilo (2004), Jovan Ćulibrk (ed.), Crkvene prilike u Zeti u doba Nikona Jerusalimca (in Serbian), Cetinje, Belgrade: Svetigora, Publikum, pp. 73–108, archived from the original on 2013-12-11
