= Lazarević dynasty =

Serbian medieval royal family

Lazarević Лазаревић
- Parent house: Nemanjić dynasty
- Country: Serbia
- Founded: before 1300 (noble family); 1371 (royal family)
- Founder: Pribac Hrebeljanović (noble family); Lazar Hrebeljanović (royal family)
- Final ruler: Stefan Lazarević
- Titles: Prince, Despot
- Dissolution: 1427

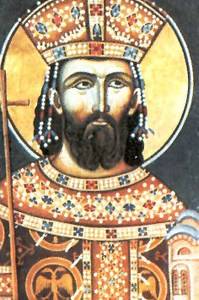
Duke (or Tsar) Lazar Hrebeljanović

The House of Lazarević (Serbian Cyrillic: Лазаревић, pl. Lazarevići, Лазаревићи, pronounced [lazǎːrɛv̞itɕ]) was a Serbian medieval royal family, which ruled Moravian Serbia and the Serbian Despotate.

== History ==
The dynasty began with Lazar Hrebeljanović, son of Pribac Hrebeljanović – a logothete at the court of Emperor Stefan Uroš IV Dušan. Lazar married Milica Nemanjić, member of the collateral branch of the reigning Nemanjić dynasty, and was later given the title "Knez" by Serbian Emperor Stefan Uroš V. He steadily gained lands in Central Serbia and through his ties with the Nemanjićs he became the regent of Moravian Serbia. Lazar assembled a wide coalition in the hope of defeating and pushing back the ascending Ottoman Empire in the Battle of Kosovo. Both Lazar and Sultan Murad I were slain in this battle, which did slow down the Ottomans, however, the long term consequences of the battle were more harmful to the less-numbered Serbs. Most of Lazar's children would become prominent personalities, such as Despot Stefan "The Tall", Jelena Lazarević-Balšić-Kosača and Olivera.

== Monarchs ==
Rulers of Moravian Serbia from 1371 to 1427.

- Lazar Hrebeljanović (1371–1389)
- Milica Hrebeljanović (1389–1393)
- Stefan Lazarević (1389–1427)

== Family tree ==
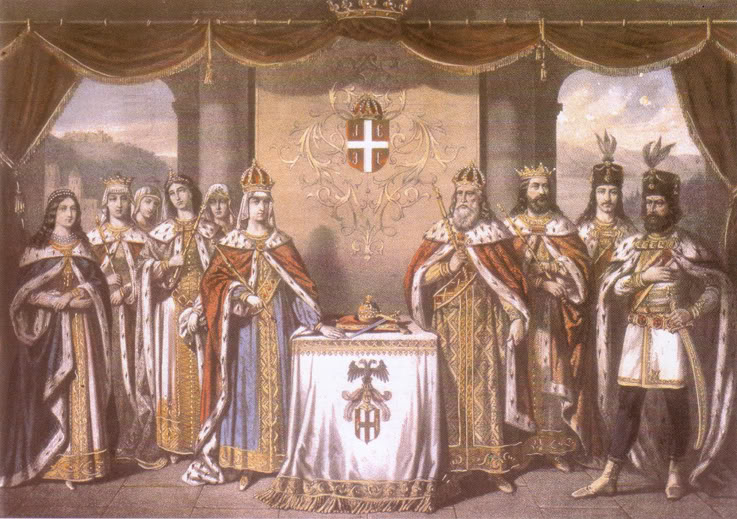
Tsar Lazar and his family, 1860.

- Pribac
  - Draginja, who married Čelnik Musa, founder of Musić noble family
  - Lazar; Lazarevići
  - Ratoslava, who married Grand Župan Altoman Vojinović

Lazarević

Lazar married Princess Milica Nemanjic in around 1353 and had at least seven children:

- Mara, married Vuk Branković, founder of Branković dynasty in around 1371 and died April 12, 1426,
- Stefan Lazarević (c. 1377 – July 19, 1427), Prince (1389–1402) and Despot (1402–1427), married Helene Gattilusio, daughter of Francesco II of Lesbos in 1405, granddaughter of Princess Maria Palaiologina, sister of the Byzantine emperor John V Palaiologos.
- Vuk, Prince, executed on July 6, 1410
- Dragana, married Emperor Ivan Shishman of Bulgaria in around 1386, died before July 1395
- Teodora, married Nicholas II Garay, Palatine of Hungary and member of powerful Garay family
- Jelena (Jela), married Đurađ II Stracimirović, Lord of Zeta and member of Balšić noble family, then Sandalj Hranić, Grand Duke of Bosnia and member of Kosača noble family and died March 1443,
- Olivera Despina (1372 – after 1444), married Ottoman Sultan Bayezid I in 1390

== Sources ==
- Ćirković, Sima (2004). The Serbs. Malden: Blackwell Publishing.
- Fine, John Van Antwerp Jr. (1994) [1987]. The Late Medieval Balkans: A Critical Survey from the Late Twelfth Century to the Ottoman Conquest. Ann Arbor, Michigan: University of Michigan Press.
- Sedlar, Jean W. (1994). East Central Europe in the Middle Ages, 1000-1500. Seattle: University of Washington Press.
- Veselinović, Andrija & Ljušić, Radoš (2001). Српске династије, Platoneum.
- Fajfrić, Željko. Sveta loza kneza Lazara.
- Marjanović-Dušanić, Smilja. "Dinastija i svetost u doba porodice Lazarević: stari uzori i novi modeli." Zbornik radova Vizantoloskog instituta 43 (2006): 77-97.
