= Korisha Fortress =

Hilltop fortress in Kosovo

- Albanian: Kalaja e Korishës
- Korishë, near Prizren in Kosovo

Site information
- Owner: Kosovo
- Open to the public: Yes

Location
- Location within Kosovo
- Coordinates: 42°15′04″N 20°47′59″E

Site history
- Built: Late Antiquity, circa V-IV AD

Cultural Heritage under Permanent Protection
- Official name: Kalaja e Korishës
- Type: Archaeological Heritage: Reservation
- Reference no.: 2946

Korisha Fortress is a hilltop fortress in Kosovo that dates back to prehistoric and ancient times. It has archaeological and historical values as a site of a Paleo-Christian church of the 6th century, as well as various ceramic vessels from different periods. The fortress overlooks the Prizren plain and the Dukagjin plain, and was declared under permanent protection by the Kosovo Council for Cultural Heritage in 2016.

== Location ==
Korisha Fortress is located in the southeast of the village of Korisha, in a dominant position for the Prizren plain and the entire Dukagjin Plain.

== History ==
The prehistoric and ancient settlement of Korisha has archaeological and historical values. It dates from prehistoric periods, Late Antiquity to the early Byzantine period. The archaeological excavations carried out in 2002 and 2004 on the hill of the Korisha fortress, brought out the contours and documented the floor plan of a Paleo-Christian church of the 6th century. The church in question is located within the inner area of the fort and has an east-facing apse. In this part, traces of the synchronism constructed in a staggered and trapezoid shape were found. Within the space of the altar, parts of the railing were also identified.

As for the movable archaeological material, some fragments of prehistoric ceramic vessels, probably related to the site in front of the Middle Bronze Period, as well as fragments of various vessels such as amphora, pitosa, vorba, jug, etc., came to light here. dated to late late antiquity, c. VI.

Based on the archaeological and historical values, the Korisha Fortress asset was declared under permanent protection by the Kosovo Council for Cultural Heritage in 2016.

== See also ==
- List of fortifications in Kosovo
