= Donji Murići =

Donji Murići Доњи Мурићи Muriq i Poshtëm
- Village
- Location within Montenegro
- Coordinates: 42.158401°N 19.213565°E
- Country: Montenegro
- Municipality: Bar

Population (2011)
  - Total: 101
- Time zone: UTC+1 (CET)
  - Summer (DST): UTC+2 (CEST)

Donji Murići (Serbian Cyrillic: Доњи Мурићи; Albanian: Muriq i Poshtëm) is a village in the municipality of Bar, in southwestern Montenegro. It is located in the Skadarska Krajina region, by Lake Skadar.

== Geography ==
Donji Murići (Muriq i Poshtëm/Lower Murići) is a division of the village Murići (Muriq). The village and its surrounding territory is divided into five neighbourhoods: Gornji Murići (Muriq i Sipërm/Upper Murići), Donji Murići, Rjeps, Pinç and the islet Beška (Bes).

== Demographics ==
According to the 2011 census, its population was 101.

Ethnicity in 2011
Ethnicity	Number	Percentage
Albanians	76	75.2%
Montenegrins	12	11.9%
other/undeclared	13	12.9%
Total	101	100%
