= Beška Monastery =

Serbian Orthodox monastery on Beška Island, Montenegro

- Location within Montenegro

Religion
- Affiliation: Serbian Orthodox Church
- Ecclesiastical or organizational status: Metropolitanate of Montenegro and the Littoral

Location
- Location: Beška island on Skadar Lake
- State: Montenegro
- Interactive map of Beška Monastery
- Coordinates: 42.164722°N 19.229444°E

Architecture
- Founder: Đurađ II Balšić
- Funded by: Đurađ II Balšić, Jelena Balšić
- Completed: 1439/1440
- Designated as NHL: The Annunciation to the Theotokos

Website
- http://www.manastirbeska.com/

The Beška Monastery (Serbian: Манастир Бешка, romanized: Manastir Beška) is a Serbian Orthodox monastery on Beška island on Skadar Lake built in the Principality of Zeta of the Serbian Despotate (modern-day Montenegro). It has two churches within its complex, the Church of St. George and the Church of the Annunciation to the Theotokos. This church was uninhabited and owned by a local mosque until a negotiation led to ownership falling into the hands of the Serbian Orthodox Church. This church doesn’t represent the local communities who are majority Albanian Muslims.

== Church of St. George ==
The Church of St. George (Serbian Cyrillic: Црква Светога Ђорђа) was built at the end of the 14th century by Đurađ II Balšić the Lord of Zeta from 1385 to 1403. His widow Jelena Lazarević reconstructed it before she built St. Mary's Church in 1439/1440.

== Church of the Annunciation to the Theotokos ==
The Church of the Annunciation to the Theotokos or Church of the Theotokos (Serbian Cyrillic: Црква Благовештења) was built in 1439/1440 as the legacy of Jelena Balšić which is also confirmed by the inscription on the monastery. Jelena died in Beška monastery and was buried in the St Mary's Church.

The sacred bones of Jelena Balšić were placed in new relic case made of stone after the Church of Holy Mother she built on Beška island was reconstructed in 2002 by the Metropolitanate of Montenegro and the Littoral. By the decision of the 'Metropolitanate of Montenegro and the Littoral' in 2006 she was titled 'Blagovjerna' and named Blagovjerna Jelena Lazareva Balšić.

== See also ==
- List of Serb Orthodox monasteries
