= Jefimija =

Serbian poet (1349–1405)

Saint Jefimija Јефимија Jelena Mrnjavčević Јелена Мрњавчевић
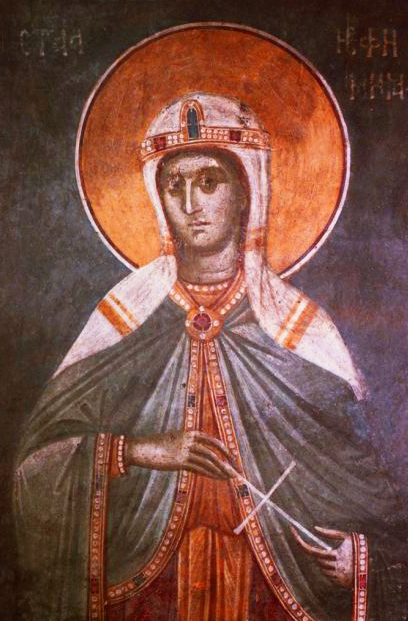
- Fresco detail in Ljubostinja Monastery
- Born: Јелена Немањић; Jelena Nemanjić
- Attributes: Orthodox Nun; Christian poetry
- Writing career
- Occupation: Nun
- Spouse: Jovan Uglješa Mrnjavčević
- Children: Uglješa Mrnjavčević Despotović
- Relatives: Vojihna Nemanjić of Drama (father); Jelena (mother)
- Years active: 14th century
- Notable works: Royal doors curtain of Hilandar; covering of Prince Lazar's; Poem Her Lament for a Dead Son; Poem Encomium of Prince Lazar Ark

Jefimija (Serbian Cyrillic: Јефимија, Serbian pronunciation: [jěfiːmija]; 1349–1405), secular name Jelena Mrnjavčević (Serbian Cyrillic: Јелена Мрњавчевић, pronounced [jělena mr̩̂ɲaːʋtʃeʋitɕ] or [mr̩ɲǎːʋ-]), was a Serbian noblewoman, wife of Jovan Uglješa Mrnjavčević, considered to be the first female Serbian poet.

== Biography ==
Her father was Caesar Vojihna, member of the collateral branch of Nemanjić dynasty. Jefimija's mother, Caesaraea Jelena, after the death of her husband became an Orthodox nun under the name Jevpraksija (Eupraxia) and in 1358 made a considerable donation to the Koutloumousiou monastery.

Jefimija's Lament for a Dead Son and Encomium of Prince Lazar are famous in the canon of medieval Serbian literature. Her lament for her beloved son was carved on the back of the diptych, (two-panelled icon representing a virgin and Child) which Teodosije, Bishop of Serres, had presented as a gift to the infant Uglješa at his baptism. The infant child Uglješa Mernjavčević Despotović lived only until the age of 4 and is buried next to his maternal grandfather, Caesar Vojihna of Drama, in the Hilandar monastery. The piece of art has Jefemija's lament engraved on its back. Apart from being considered the first Serbian female poet, Jefimija was also as a skilled needlewoman and an engraver, whose works were saved and preserved until today.

== Encomium of Prince Lazar ==
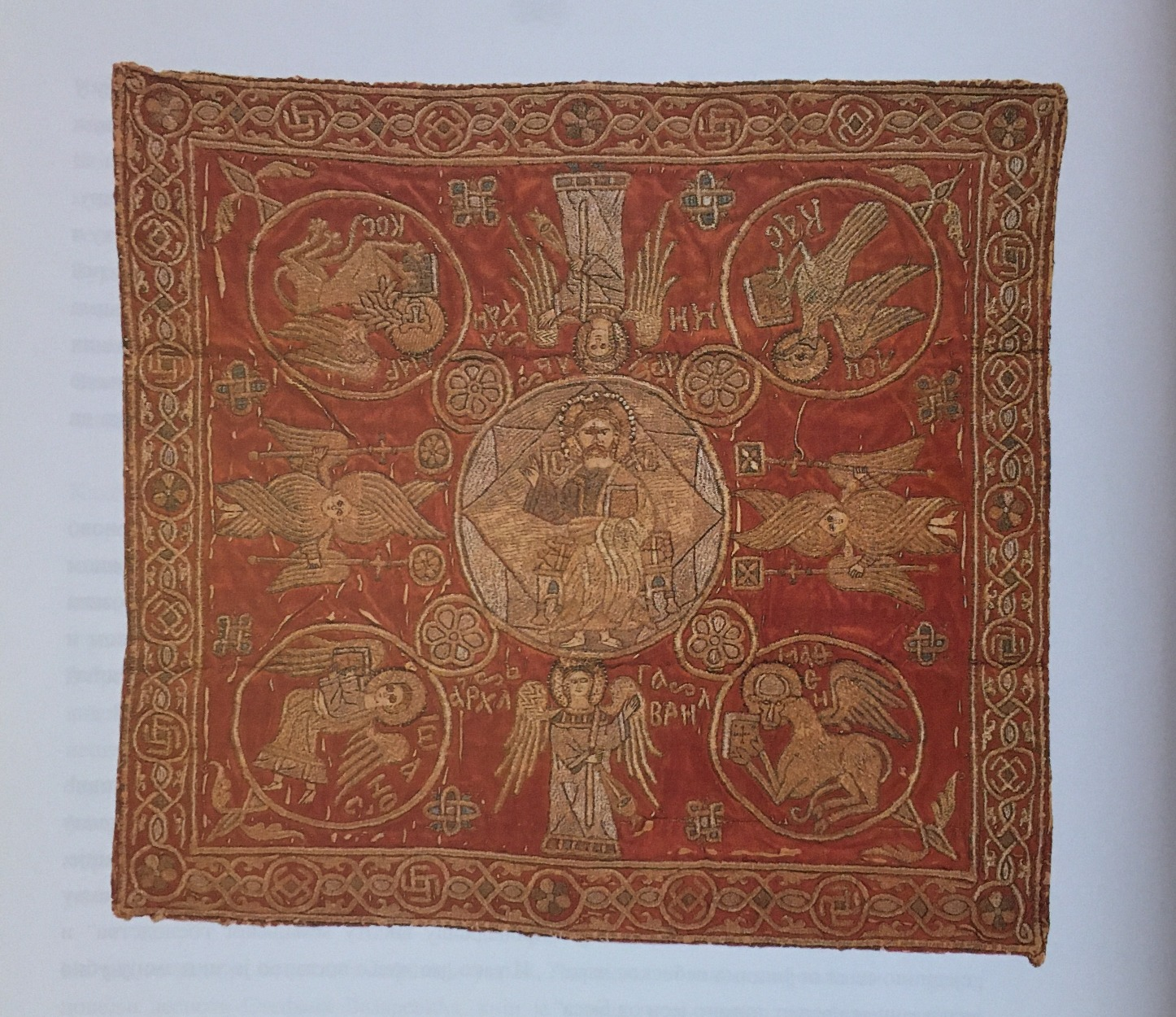
Embroidered cross standard

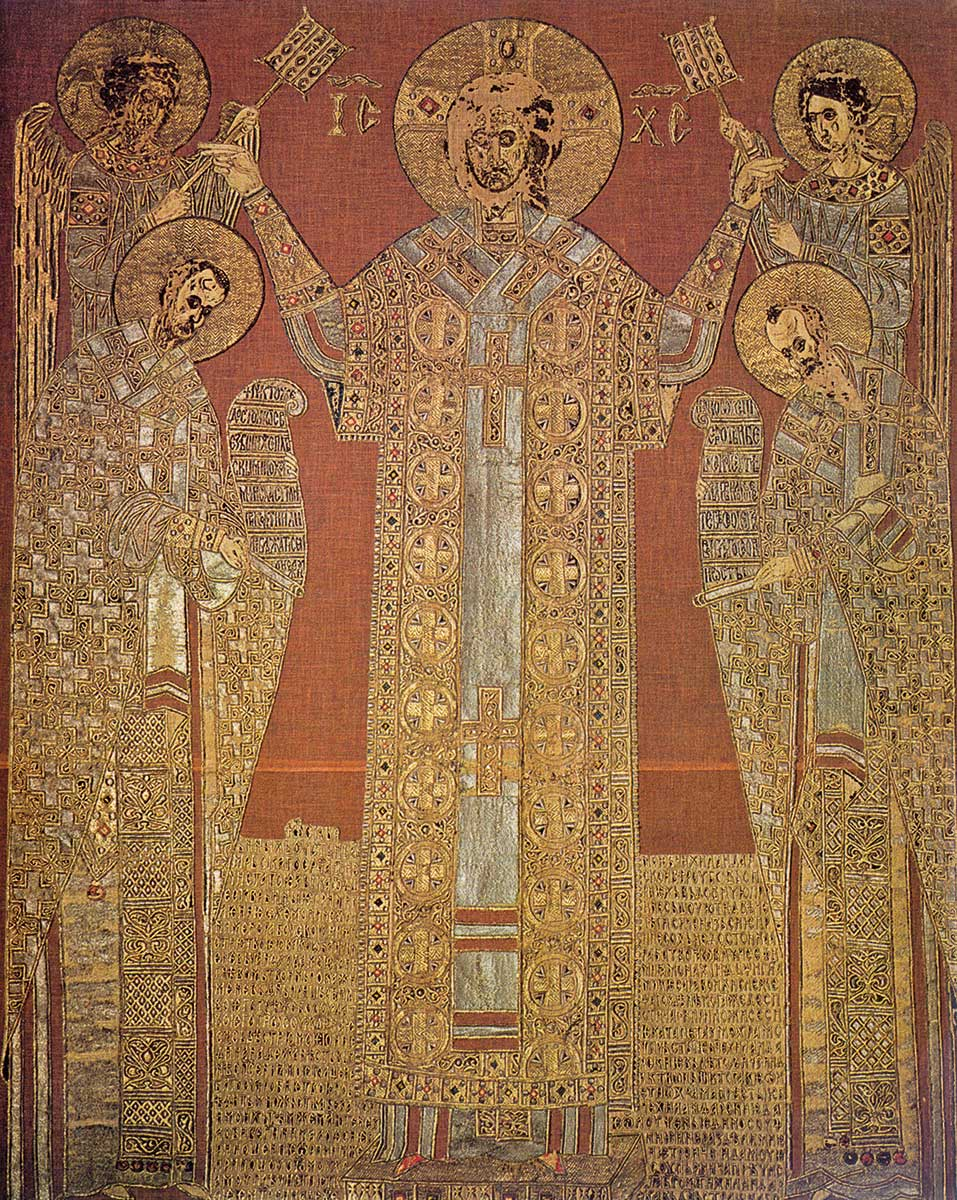
Embroidered iconography

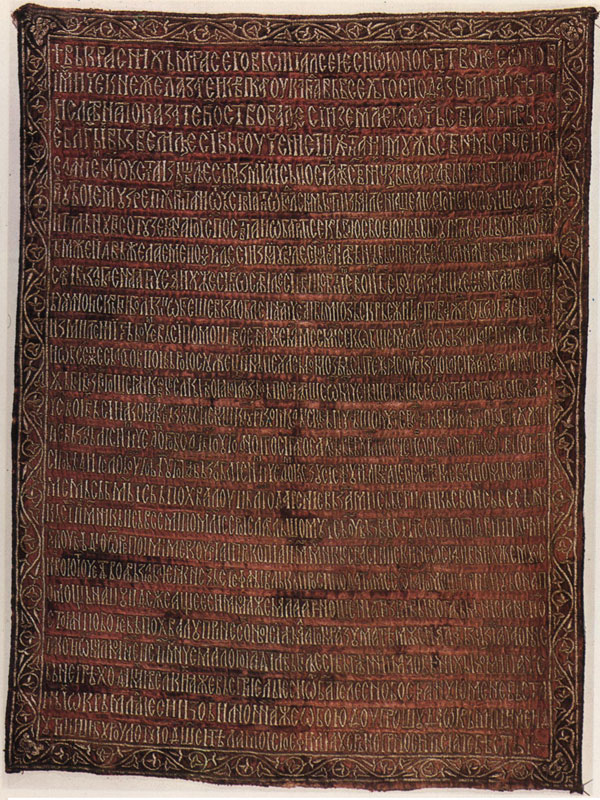
Poem

== Issue ==
Jefimija and her husband Despot Jovan Uglješa, member of the ruling House of Mrnjavčević had, at least three children, two boys and one girl, who was the only one to reach adulthood:

- Tvrtko Mrnjavčević Despotović (d. 1366)
- Uglješa Mrnjavčević Despotović (d. 1371), buried in the Hilandar monastery next to Vojihna, his maternal grandfather
- Eupraxia Mrnjavčević Despotović, became a nun in 1405

== Legacy ==
She is included in The 100 most prominent Serbs.

== See also ==
- Maria Angelina Doukaina Palaiologina
- Princess Milica of Serbia
- Saint Angelina of Serbia
- Mara Branković
- Olivera Despina
- Jelena Balšić
- Saint Helen of Serbia
- Simonida
- Katarina Branković

== Sources ==
- Ćirković, Sima (2004). The Serbs. Malden: Blackwell Publishing. ISBN 978-1-4051-4291-5.
- Gavrilović, Zaga (2006). "Women in Serbian politics, diplomacy and art at the beginning of Ottoman rule". In Jeffreys, Elizabeth M. (ed.). Byzantine Style, Religion and Civilization: In Honour of Sir Steven Runciman. Cambridge University Press. pp. 72–90. ISBN 978-0-521-83445-2.
- Pavlikianov, Cyril (2001). The Medieval Aristocracy on Mount Athos: Philological and Documentary Evidence for the Activity of Byzantine, Georgian and Slav Aristocrats and Eminent Churchmen in the Monasteries of Mount Athos from the 10th to the 15th Century. Sofia: Center for Slavo-Byzantine Studies. ISBN 978-954-07-1595-7.
