= Princess Milica of Serbia =

Serbian empress, nun, and saint

Saint Milica Nemanjić Hrebeljanović Милица Немањић Хребељановић
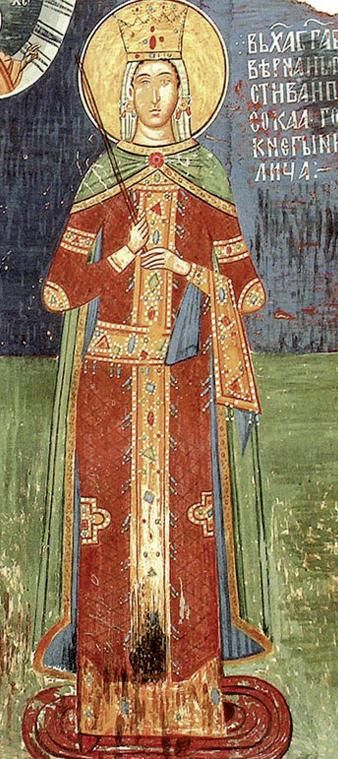

Tsaritsa Milica
- Born: 1335
- Died: November 11, 1405
- Venerated in: Eastern Orthodox Church
- Burial: Ljubostinja
- Spouse: Lazar of Serbia
- Issue: Stefan Lazarević
- House: Nemanjić dynasty
- Father: Vratko Nemanjić
- Religion: Serbian Orthodox

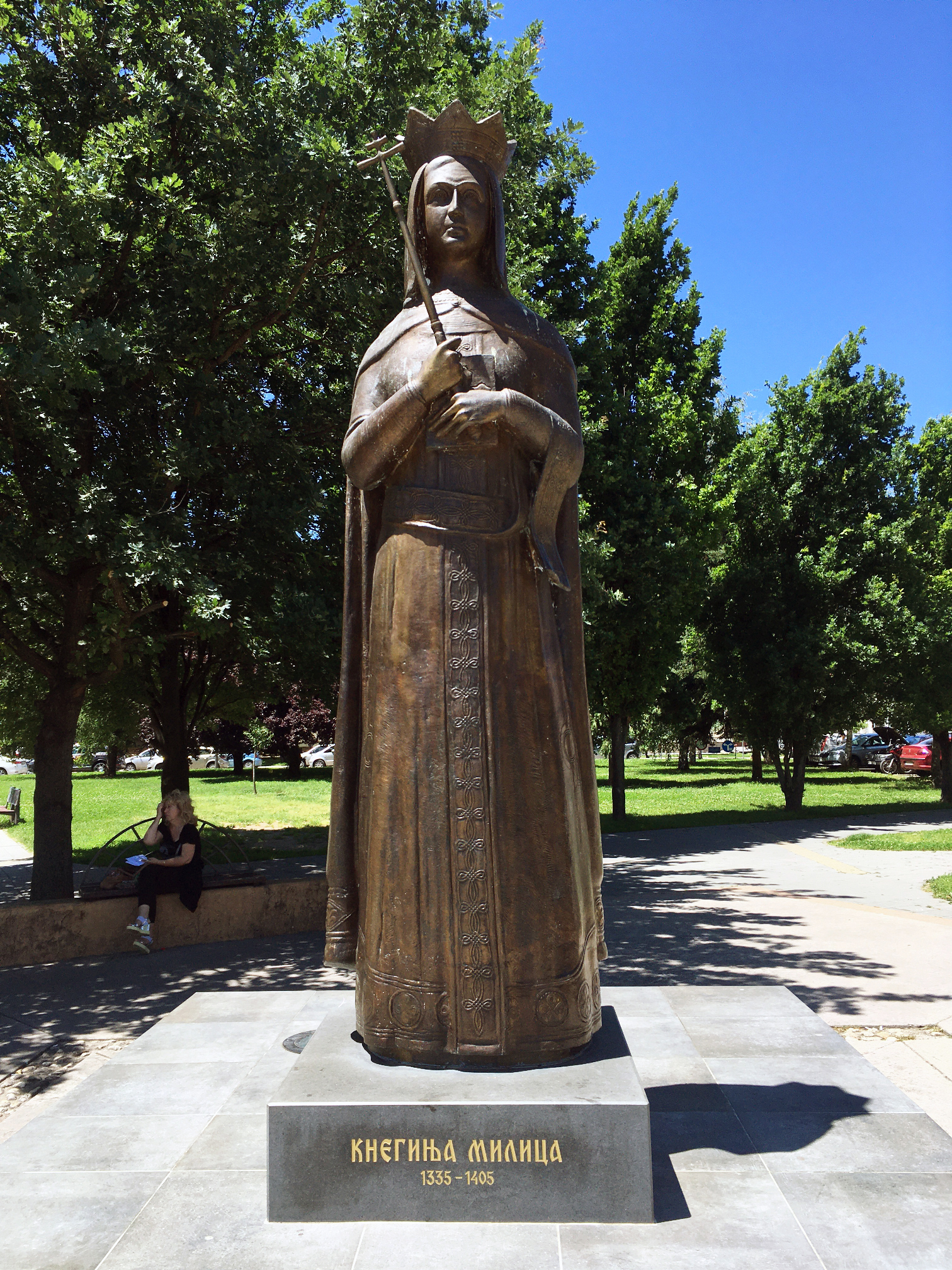
Statue of Princess Milica in Trstenik

Princess Milica Hrebeljanović née Nemanjić (Serbian: Милица Немањић Хребељановић · ca. 1335 – November 11, 1405) also known as Empress (Tsaritsa) Milica, was a royal consort of Serbia by marriage to Prince Lazar, who fell in the Battle of Kosovo. After her husband's death, she took the role as queen regent of Serbia from 1389 to 1393, until her son, despot Stefan Lazarević came of age.

She later became a Serbian Orthodox nun under the name Jevgenija. She is the author of "A Mother's Prayer" (Serbian: Молитва матере) and a famous poem of mourning for her husband, My Widowhood's Bridegroom (Serbian: Удовству мојему женик).

== Biography ==
=== Early life ===
She was the daughter of Prince Vratko Nemanjić (known in Serb epic poetry as Jug Bogdan), who as a great-grandson of Vukan Nemanjić, Grand Prince of Serbia (ruled 1202–1204), was part of the collateral, but elder branch of the Nemanjić dynasty. She was the fourth cousin once removed of Dušan the Mighty, Emperor of Serbia. An inscription indicates that Milica had a single brother, the župan Nikola, a son of Vratko Nemanjić, who was buried in 1379 in the Monastery of St. Nicholas in Kuršumlija. She was married to Prince Lazar Hrebeljanović. Through female lineage, her children with Prince Lazar, members of the Lazarević dynasty, are direct descendants of Nemanjić dynasty.

Tsaritsa Milica was particularly known for her strong personality.

=== Regency ===
After the death of her husband at the Battle of Kosovo in 1389, Milica ruled Serbia until 1393 when her son, Stefan Lazarević, came of age to take the throne. The aftermaths of the Battle in Kosovo were considered very turbulent times for Serbia. Almost immediately in her reign, in November 1389, she was attacked by the Hungarians under Sigismund, who hoped to take advantage of Serbia's weakness after the Battle of Kosovo. The Hungarians took a series of the Serbs' northern fortresses and penetrated as far south as Kragujevac. Scholars disagree on the results of this attack and of the further fighting that occurred between Hungary and Serbia in the ensuing years. It is possible that Hungarians abandoned those lands, making it possible for Milica to regain some of it.

Vuk Branković, one of the leaders led by Prince Lazar in the Battle of Kosovo, became an issue for Milica's reign. Branković had prior to the battle accepted Lazar as his overlord, and now that Lazar was dead and his son wasn't of age, he attempted to overthrow Milica. As a result, the queen regent found herself caught between two ambitious enemies, the Hungarians and Branković, who were now negotiating together and on the verge of forging an alliance. The pressure continued when Ottomans had reached Milica's border in the summer of 1390, in which she saw no other choice than accepting Ottoman suzerainty and allowed the Turks free passage through her lands.

This quarrel between Branković and Milica, though very short-lasting, seems to have led Milica to unleash a propaganda campaign of slander. Therefore, it has made scholars to believe it might have influenced the early sources about Battle of Kosovo, in which Branković is accused of alleged treachery against Prince Lazar by having secret negotiations with Sultan Murad.

=== Nun ===
She founded the Ljubostinja monastery around 1390 and later took monastic vows at her monastery and became the nun Eugenia (Јевгенија, later abbess Euphrosine, Јефросина) around 1393.

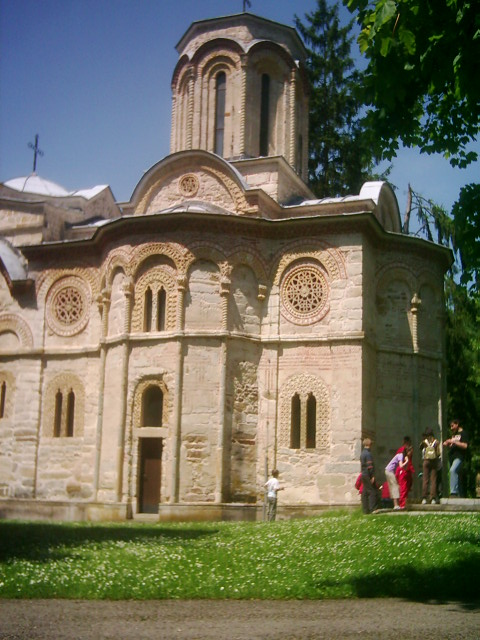
Ljubostinja monastery, founded by Milica

In later diplomatic negotiations with Sultan Bayezid I, Eugenia and Euphemia, the former Vasilissa of Serres, both travelled to the Sultan's court in 1398/99.

In 1403, Eugenia went to the Sultan at Serres, arguing in favour of her son Stefan Lazarević in a complicated dispute that had emerged between her two sons and Branković.

=== Writer ===
Princess Milica was also a writer. She wrote several prayers and religious poems. In 1397 she issued "A Mother's Prayer" together with her sons at the Dečani monastery. She commissioned the repairing of the bronze horos of Dečani.

=== Death and burial ===
She was buried in Ljubostinja, her monastery. She was canonized by the Serbian Orthodox Church.

== Family ==
With Prince Lazar she had eight children, three sons and five daughters:

- Jelena Lazarević, who married Đurađ II Balšić, Prince of Zeta and later Sandalj Hranić Kosača, Grand Duke of Hum
- Mara Lazarević, who married Vuk Branković
- Dragana Lazarević, who married Emperor Ivan Shishman of Bulgaria
- Teodora Lazarević
- Olivera Lazarević, wife of Sultan Bayezid I, whom she married after Battle of Kosovo as a pledge of peace.
- Dobrovoj Lazarević, died after birth
- Stefan Lazarević, Serbian ruler as prince (1389–1402) and despot (1402–1427).
- Vuk Lazarević

== Legacy ==
=== Street names ===
Several streets throughout Central Serbia are named after the Princess. In the once thriving industrial city of Trstenik, Serbia, the main street that runs directly through city center is named Kneginje Milice. Trstenik, Serbia, is the closest major city to her burial site at Ljubostinja Monastery.

There is a Kneginje Milice street also located in Lazarevac, in the neighbourhood of Lukavica. The street is about 250 m long.

== See also ==
- Lazarević dynasty
- Jefimija
- Saint Angelina of Serbia
- Olivera Lazarević
- Jelena Balšić
- Saint Helen of Serbia
- Simonida
- Maria Angelina Doukaina Palaiologina
- Mara Branković
- Katarina Branković

== Sources ==
- Stevanović, Miladin (2005). Kneginja Milica Hrebeljanović. Knjiga-komerc. ISBN 9788677120795.
- Vasiljević, Marija (2016). "Генеалогије између историје и идеологије: пример порекла кнегиње Милице" (PDF). Историјски часопис. 65. Belgrade: Istorijski institut: 79–100. Archived from the original (PDF) on 2018-03-24.
