= Nikon of Jerusalem =

Serbian writer

Nikon of Jerusalem (Serbian: Никон Јерусалимац, romanized: Nikon Jerusalemac; c. 1380 – after 1468) was a Serbian medieval writer.

== Life ==
Nikon may have been of Greek origin.

Nikon's activities can be traced only from 1439. He corresponded extensively with Jelena Lazarević from this date. Between 31 August and 25 November 1442, he received the great schema tonsure and took the religious name Nikandar. As Nikandar, he drafted and witnessed the last will and testament of Jelena on 25 November 1442.

== Works ==
In his epistles to Jelena, written in a natural, personal tone, Nikon develops the theory of monastic life in hesychasm and the genealogy of the virtues of the Nemanjic lineage, claiming for his spiritual daughter that "a good offspring springs from good" roots". Their correspondence in the literary-aesthetic and spiritual sense is one of the very peaks of Serbian medieval epistolography. He compiled the Gorički zbornik (1441–1442) in which, in addition to these letters, he included translations and transcripts of some old works, as well as his travelogue A Tale of Jerusalem Churches and Places in the Desert in which, in addition to the topography of the Holy Land, he has condensed poetic and philosophical lyrics.

Nikon of Jerusalem also wrote Zitije svetog Simeona Mirotočivog (The Life of Saint Simeon). His work can also be found in the Hexaemeron in the Manuscript No 21 of the Monastery of Savina.
