= Paštrović =

Paštrović (Cyrillic: Паштровић) is a Croatian, Montenegrin and Serbian surname, which may refer to:

- Borko Paštrović (1875–1912), Serbian military commander
- Melinda Pastrovics (born 1981), Hungarian handball coach and former player
- Stefan Paštrović (fl. 1597), hieromonk of the Serbian Orthodox Church
