= Prizrenac (fortress) =

Fortress in Kosovo

Prizrenac (Serbian Cyrillic: Призренац) is a fortress located 12 km southwest of Novo Brdo, Kosovo, on the top of the Gradishtë (856 m) in Kamenica that dominates the environment.

== See also ==
- Novo Brdo (fortress)
- Prilepac (fortress)
- List of fortresses in Kosovo
