= Drisht Castle =

Drisht Castle Kalaja e Drishtit
- Drisht, Albania
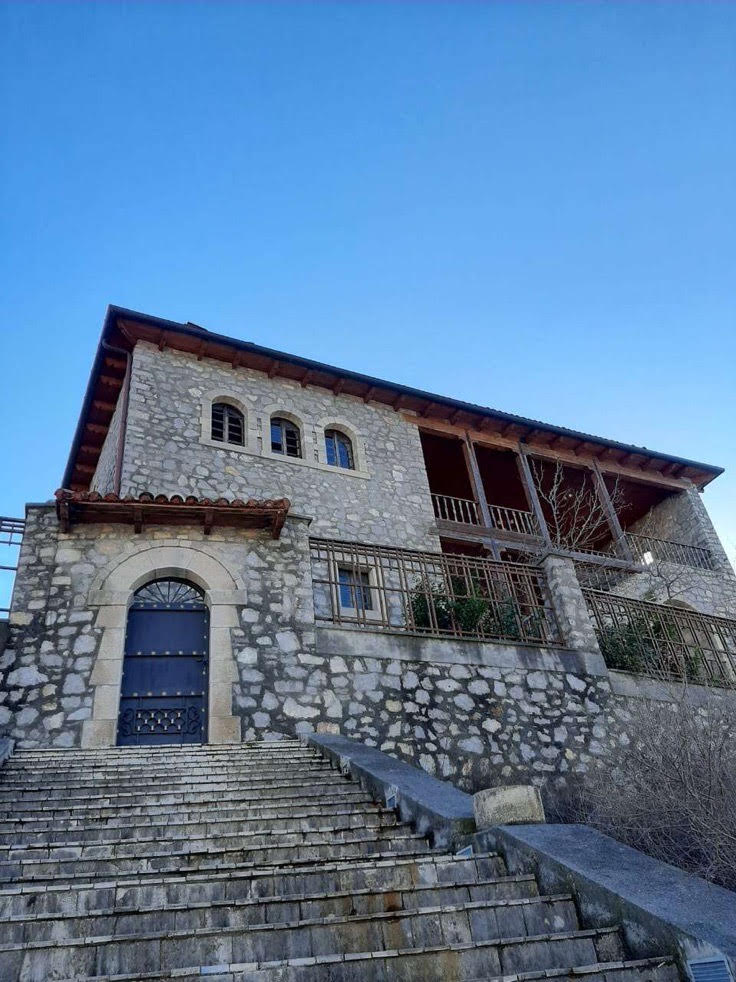
- Drishti Castle museum

Site information
- Owner: Albania

Location
- Coordinates: 42.126724°N 19.612139°E

Drisht Castle (Albanian: Kalaja e Drishtit) is a ruined castle above the modern Albanian village of Drisht, medieval Drivastum, in the municipal unit Postribë, Shkodër County, Albania.

== History ==
The settlement's origins date back to the Roman city of Drivastum. Drivastum was first mentioned as a bishopric at the end of the 10th century. In 1184 the Serbian ruler Stefan Nemanja conquered the city. After the collapse of the Serbian Empire in the second half of the 14th century, Drisht became an independent city which minted its own coins with the inscription Civitatis Drivasti. Between 1369 and 1396 Drisht was ruled by the Balsha noble family, and then by the Republic of Venice. After the city became part of the Ottoman Empire in 1476, the population moved to Venetian possessions, and the settlement turned into a small village.

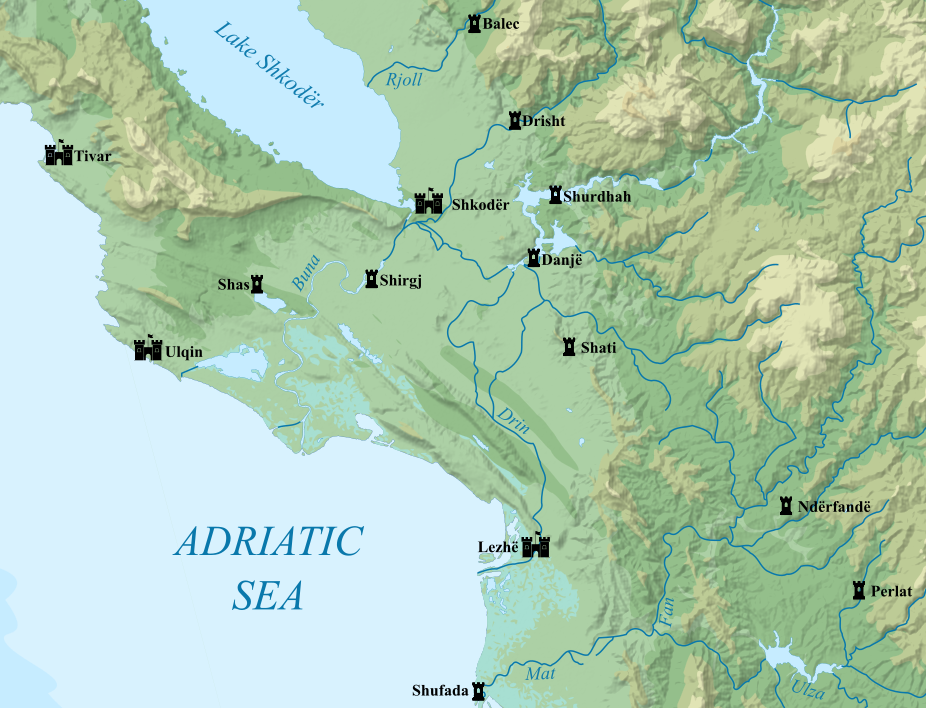
Drisht and nearby towns

The city walls attest to two main construction phases. The older one is dated to the 10th century, while the newer one to the 13th or 14th century. In the 15th century, in the Venetian period, further work was done to make the walls withstand artillery fire. The castle, nowadays in ruins, had an irregular ground plan. Towers were built only from the side of the city below, because on the opposite side there was a cliff which prevented access. The castle was initially built with three rectangular towers, to which a round tower was added later. At a later date one of the rectangular towers was repaired and made suitable for heavy artillery usage through loopholes.

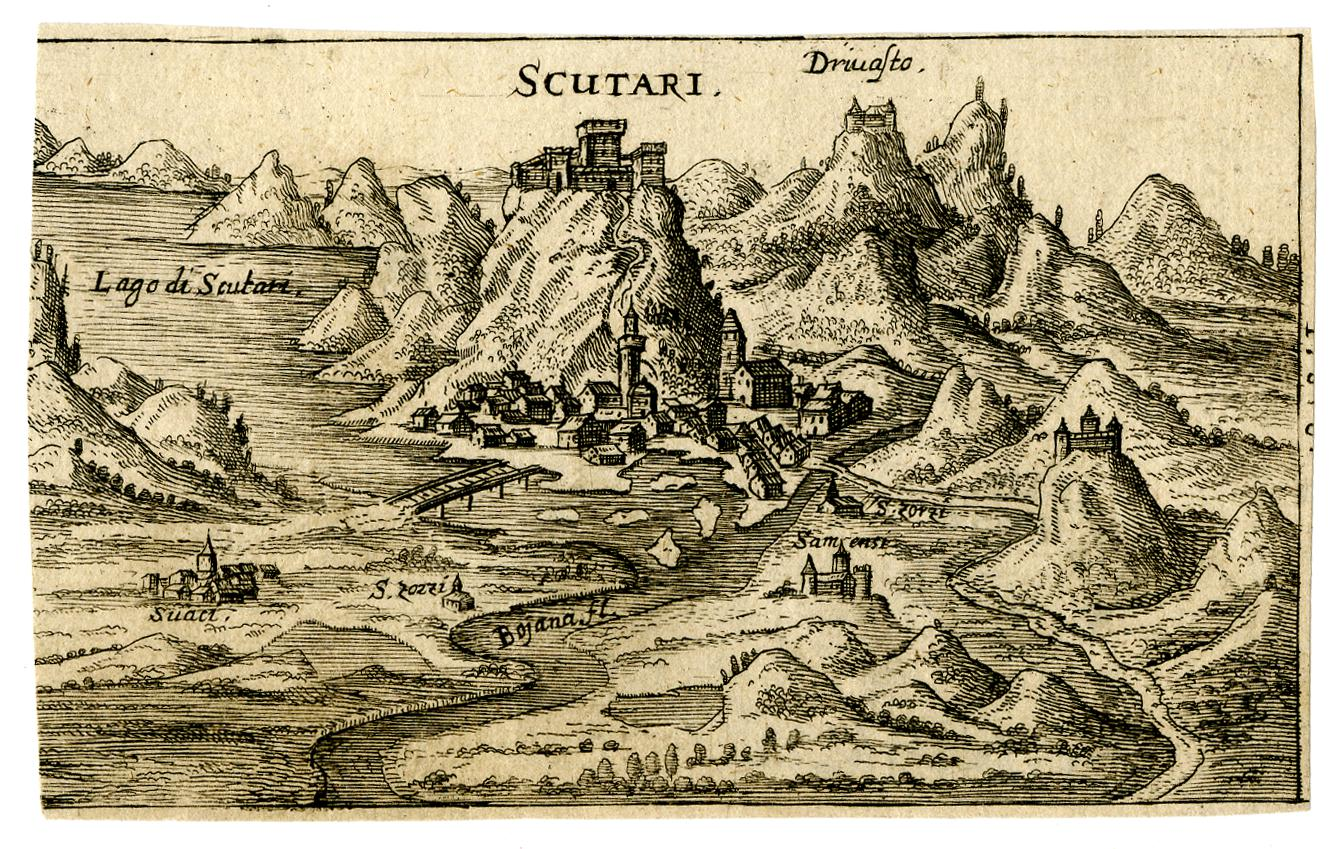
View of Shkodër in the distance and Drisht to the right - 17th century

Today there are the remains of 11 houses inside the castle walls, while the ruins of a trinoch church are found between the castle and the town. A museum building was built in recent years. The Kir river nearby was spanned by a bridge, whose pillars in the riverbed can be seen when the water level is down.

== Sources ==
- Shala-Peli, Teuta (2014). Drishti në Mesjetë [Drisht in the Middle Ages] (Thesis). Academy of Sciences of Albania-Center of Albanological Studies.
