= Lipa, Peja =

Village in Peja, Kosovo

Coordinates: 42°46′N 20°49′E

Lipa (Serbian: Lipa Липа; Albanian: Lipë, definite form: Lipa) is a village located in the mountains of Peja, Kosovo. It is notable for being the origin place of the family of singer Dua Lipa.

== Name ==
The name "Lipa" comes from the tribe with the same name that inhabited the village. Previous names used until the 90's included "Kikuçaj" and "Kalajë".

== Geography ==
Lipa is located in Kosovo in the region of the Dukagjini Plain, in the mountains of the city of Peja. It is located 2000+ meters above sea level. It is located on Mt. Hasan. In Lipa there is also a running water source called Gurra Lipa. The village is also known for its caves.

== History ==
Lipa is purported to have been inhabited since ancient times, initially belonging to the Lipa tribe. According to legend, Mt. Hasan received its name from a man named Hasan who fell from the mountain and died.

=== Castle of Lipa ===
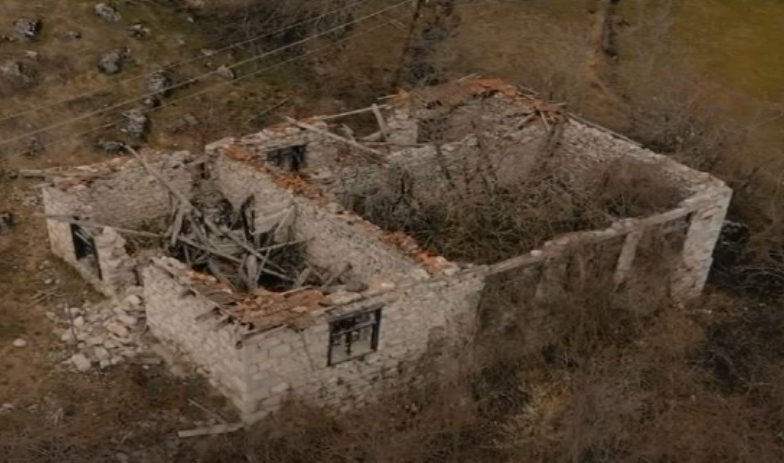
Ruins of the Castle of Lipa

The Castle of Lipa is a protected Kosovar heritage monument located in the hillside near the village. The walls are built by stone and the castle is thought to have been built in late Antiquity or in the early Middle Ages.

== Demographics ==
According to one villager, Lipa used to have 50 houses as well as a functional school, however, nowadays the village is nearly abandoned as most of its population moved to Peja. The main occupations in Lipa are hunting, farming and agriculture.

== See also ==
- Bogë, Kosovo
- Qyshk
- Radac
