= Olivera Lazarević =

Wife of Sultan Bayezid I

Olivera Despina
- Hatun
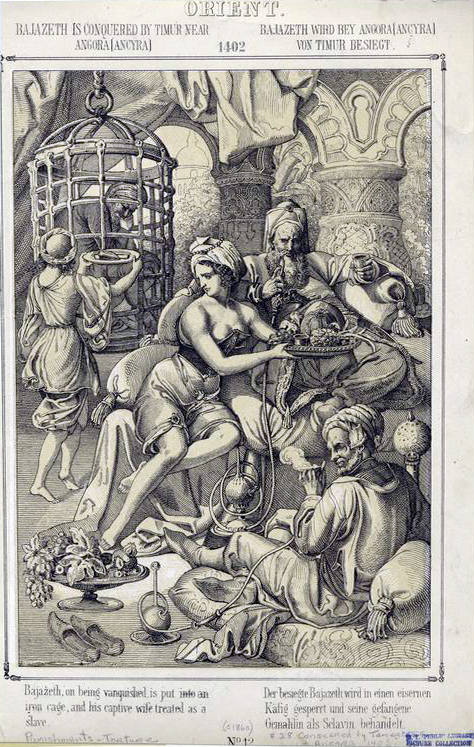
- Bayezid I is encaged, while his captive wife (Olivera Despina) is treated as a slave (1860) by Peter Johann Nepomuk Geiger
- Born: c. 1372; Kruševac, Moravian Serbia
- Died: c. 1444 (aged 71–72); Serbian Despotate
- Spouse: Bayezid I (m. 1390; death 1403)
- Issue: Öruz Hatun; Paşa Melek Hatun
Names
- Marija Olivera Lazarević; Despina Hatun
- House: Lazarević birth Ottoman marriage
- Father: Lazar Hrebeljanović of Serbia
- Mother: Milica Nemanjić

Marija Olivera Lazarević (Serbian Cyrillic: Марија Оливера Лазаревић; 1372 – after 1444), or Olivera Despina Hatun, was a Serbian princess and consort of the Ottoman sultan Bayezid I, whom she married just after the Battle of Kosovo in 1389 as a pledge of peace between the Lazarević and Ottoman dynasties. She was the youngest daughter of Lazar of Serbia and Princess Milica.

The story of Olivera's and Bayezid's captivity by Timur after the Battle of Ankara (1402) has been popularly narrated, most often in plays and operas. The most significant of these stories is Tamburlaine (1587–1588) by Christopher Marlowe, in which she is named “Zabina”.

== Biography ==
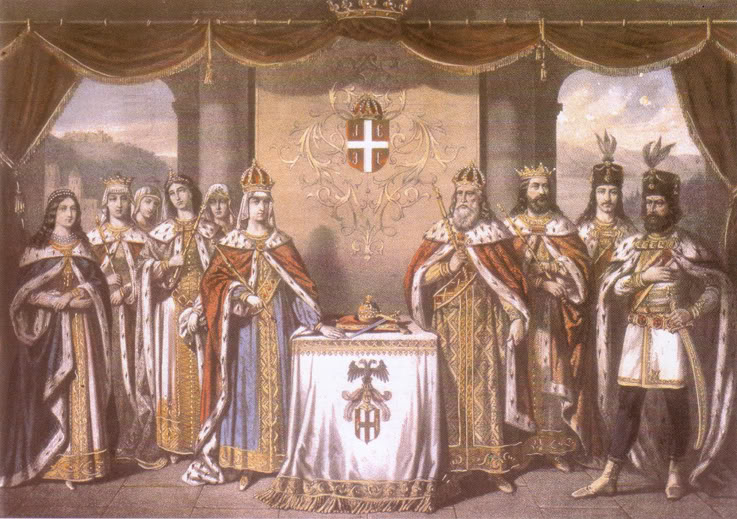
Tsar Lazar and his family (ca. 1860) by Pavle Čortanović. Olivera Despina is shown as the first from the left.

Olivera was born around 1372, the youngest daughter of Prince Lazar and Princess Milica of Serbia. Her mother was a descendant of Grand Prince (Veliki Župan) Stefan Nemanja, the founder of the Nemanjić dynasty and the fourth cousin once removed of Emperor Dušan of Serbia. Olivera had four older sisters—Mara (mother of Serbian despot Đurađ Branković), Dragana, Teodora, and Jelena (mother of Balša III, the last ruler of Zeta)—and two younger brothers—Serbian despot Stefan Lazarević and Vuk.

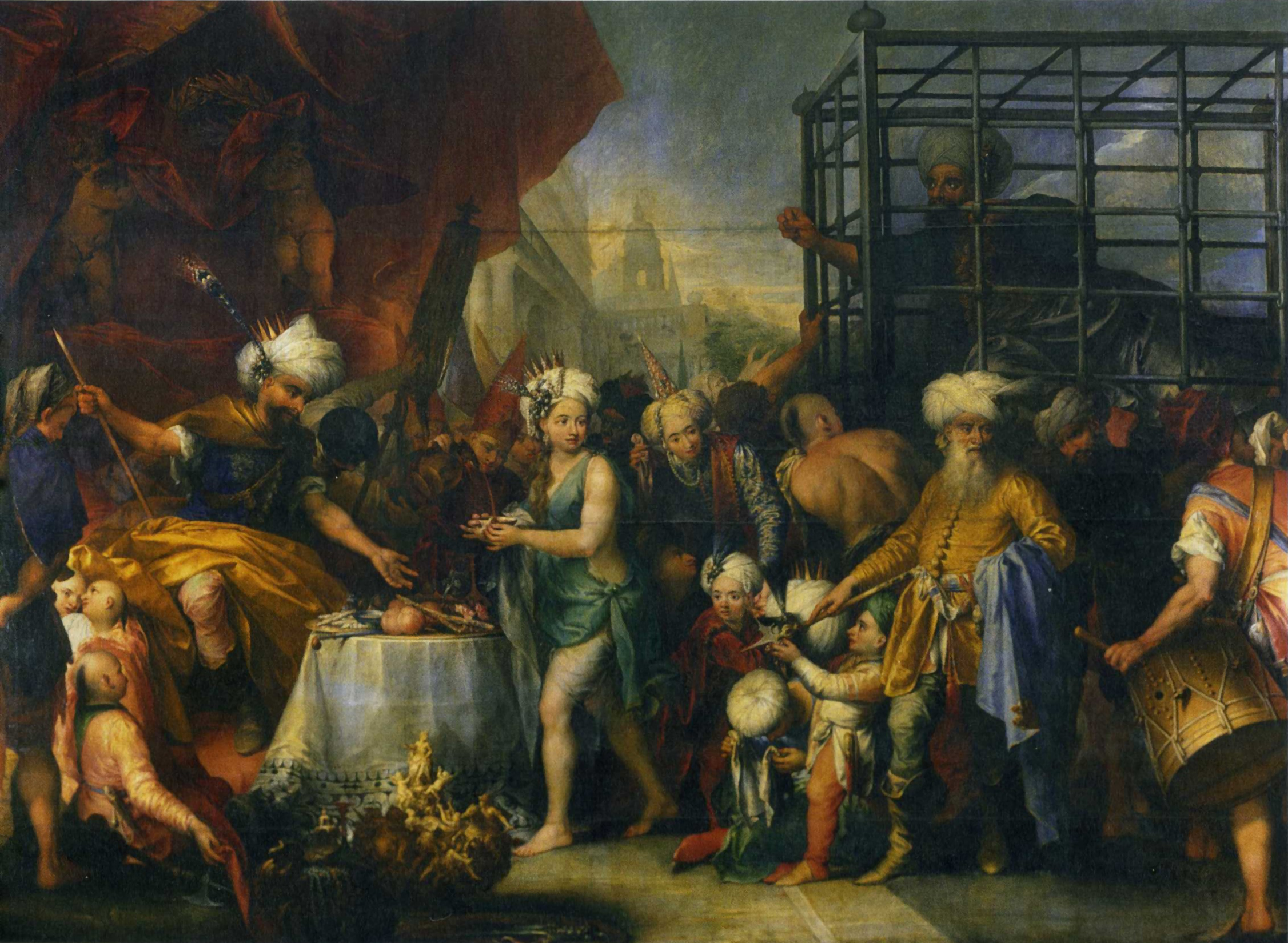
Humiliation of Olivera Despina, Bayezid and Timur (ca. 1700) by Andrea Celesti

After the Battle of Kosovo in 1389, Olivera was sent to the harem of Sultan Bayezid I where she remained for the next 12 years. They had three daughters: Öruz Hatun, Paşa Melek Hatun and an unnamed daughter. Despite her marriage, she apparently never converted to Islam. She had a considerable influence over the sultan, which helped her people, country, and family survive in turbulent times.

In the Battle of Ankara on 20 July 1402, Olivera and Bayezid were captured by Timur. Olivera was widowed in 1403. Ragusan chronicler Mavro Orbini wrote in The Kingdom of the Slavs (1601) that she died in captivity two days after Bayezid's death, which is incorrect. Serbian soldier and memoirist Konstantin Mihailović noted that Timur felt remorse for Bayezid's death and released his delegation, including his wife. After her release, she spent the rest of her life at the court of her brother Stefan in Belgrade and at the court of her sister Jelena in Herceg Novi. There she became a patron of art and literature. Olivera died around 1444.

== Issue ==
By Bayezid, she had two daughters:

- Öruz Hatun. In 1403, she married Abu Bakr Mirza, son of Mirza Celaleddin Miranşah, son of Timur. Öruz had at least a child, a daughter, Ayşe.
- Paşa Melek Hatun. In 1403, in Samarkand, she married Şemseddin Mehmed, son of Emîr Celaluddîn İslâm, a general of Timur.

== In fiction ==
The story of Olivera's and Bayezid's captivity has been popularly narrated, most often through plays and operas. The most significant one is Tamburlaine (1587–1588) by Christopher Marlowe, English playwright and poet of the Elizabethan era. In the play, she is named "Zabina". According to the story, Timur (Tamerlane) kept Bayezid (Bajazeth) in an iron cage while Zabina was forced to serve him as a slave. In the end, they both committed suicide. The same story, which included Olivera, was used in Tamerlan, ou la mort de Bajazet (1676) by Jacques Pradon, Bajazeth und Tamerlan (1690) by Johann Philipp Förtsch, and Timour the Tartar (1811) by Matthew Lewis.

== See also ==
- Mara Branković (Mara Despina Hatun)

== Sources ==
- Veselinović, Andrija; Ljušić, Radoš (2001). Srpske dinastije. Novi Sad: Platoneum. ISBN 978-86-83639-01-4.
- Keskin, Mustafa Çağhan (2017). "Osmanlı Sarayı'nda Bir Sırp Prenses: Mileva Olivera Lazarevic" (PDF). Bilig - Turk DunyasI Sosyal Bilimler Dergisi. 82: 269–301.
- Senlen Guvenc, Sıla (2007). "Dramatic Representation of the Battle of Ankara and Bayezid I's Captivation by Tamerlane Ankara Savaşı ve I. Sultan Bayezid'in Timurlenk'e Esir Düşmesinin Sahneye Yansıması". OTAM: 123–133. doi:10.1501/OTAM_0000000300.
- Ćirković, Sima (2004). The Serbs. Malden: Blackwell Publishing. ISBN 9781405142915.
- Princess Olivera, a forgotten Serbian Heroine, Princess Olivera Foundation, Belgrade 2009 (ISBN 978-86-912875-2-8)
