= Prilepac (fortress) =

Serbian medieval fortress in Kosovo

Coordinates: 42°32′24.50″N 21°31′16.16″E

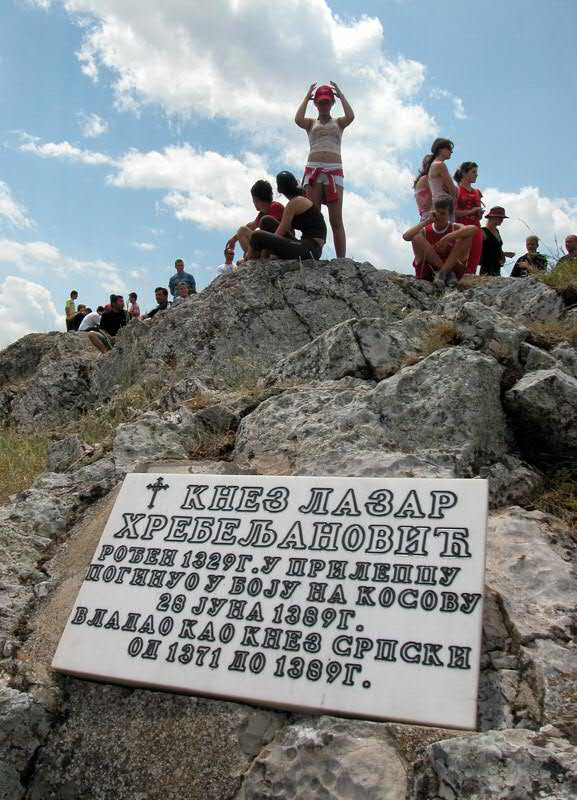
Memorial in Prilepac, dedicated to Prince Lazar

Prilepac (Serbian Cyrillic: Прилепац), or Prilepnica (Serbian Cyrillic: Прилепница), was a Serbian medieval fortress near Kamenica, Kosovo. It is most famous as the birthplace of Prince Lazar, who was born c. 1329.

== See also ==
- Novo Brdo Fortress
- Prizrenac (fortress)
- List of fortresses in Kosovo
