= Beška (island) =

Island in Lake Skadar, Montenegro

Native name: Бешка Nickname: Gorica, Beška Gorica or Brezovica
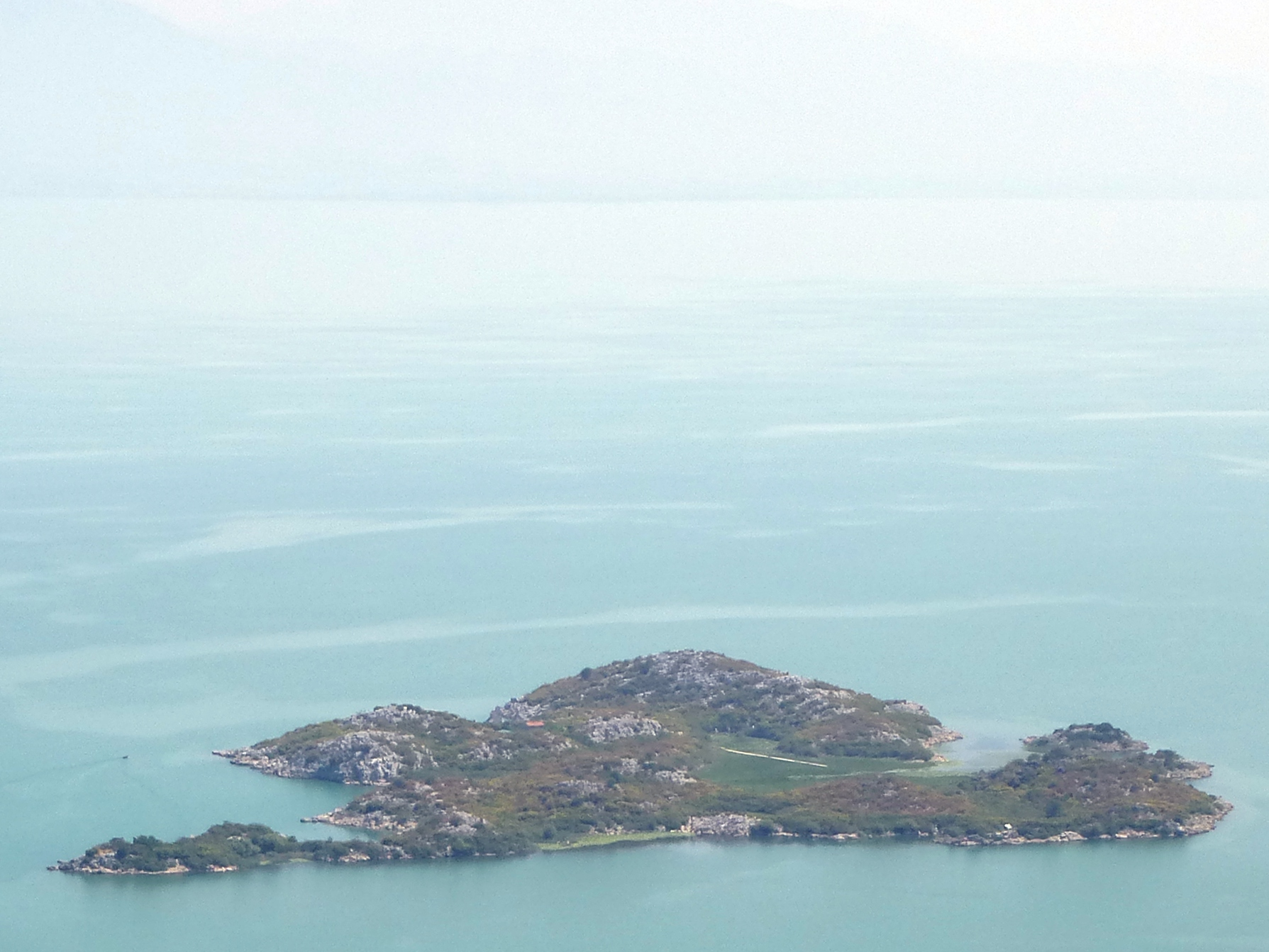
- The island

- Location within Montenegro
- Interactive map of Beška

Geography
- Coordinates: 42°09′53″N 19°13′46″E
- Adjacent to: Lake Skadar
- Area: 0.15 km^{2} (0.058 sq mi)

Administration
- Montenegro
- Capital city: Podgorica
- Largest settlement: Podgorica

Demographics
- Population: 10 ((2021))

Beška (Montenegrin: Бешка) is an islet in Lake Skadar in the municipality of Bar, in southwestern Montenegro.

== Name ==
The alternative names of the island include Gorica, Beška Gorica, Beška Velja, Brezavica and Brezovica.

== Geography ==
With the exception of the monastery, the 0.15 km^{2} (0.058 sq mi) islet is uninhabited. It was used by the villagers of Donji Murići (Muriq i poshtëm), hence it was considered part of the village's neighbourhoods. In this context, it appears with the name Murići in old maps.

== Monastery ==
There are two churches in the Beška Monastery built on the island. The older church is St. George's Church, built at the end of the 14th century by Đurađ II Balšić the Lord of Zeta from 1385 to 1403. St. Mary's Church was built in 1438/1439 by his wife, Jelena Balšić.
