= Dejan Milićević =

Serbian film director photographer

Dejan Milićević (Serbian Cyrillic: Дејан Милићевић, Serbian pronunciation: [dɛ̂jaːn milǐːt͡ɕɛvit͡ɕ]), is a Serbian music video director and fashion photographer that has directed many music videos for many famous ex-Yugoslav musicians. He has also photographed many models, some of which were used as part of the Joni Peci collection. He had also photographed popular turbo-folk singer Svetlana "Ceca" Ražnatović, who were featured in an issue of the local Playboy magazine.

== Personal life ==
Milićević lives in Belgrade.

== Music videos directed ==
=== Serbian / Croatian / Bosnian ===
- Ljubiću noćas by Edwin po
- Poslednje veče by Dragana Mirković
- Biće mi kako kad by Dragana Mirković
- Danima by Dragana Mirković
- Sama by Dragana Mirković
- Ja uspomenu čuvam by Dragana Mirković
- Ja imam te a ko da nemam te by Dragana Mirković
- Evo dobro sam by Dragana Mirković
- Pečat na usnama by Dragana Mirković
- Nepoželjna by Dragana Mirković
- Teci mi kroz vene by Dragana Mirković
- Ljubi il ubij by Dragana Mirković
- Danak ljubavi by Dragana Mirković
- Depresivan dan by Dragana Mirković
- Trovanje by Dragana Mirković
- Ne bih ja bila ja by Lepa Brena
- Metak Sa Posvetom by Lepa Brena
- Vatra by Ana Nikolić
- Još Jedna U Nizu by Mina Kostic
- Grudi Ot Betona by Mina Kostic & Igor X
- Arsenik by Dajana
- Ne mogu godinama by Danijela Vranić
- Znam by Deen and Žanamari Lalić
- Tvrdoglava by Electra
- Samo jedno reci mi by Extra Nena
- Veštica iz Srbije by Funky G and Vrčak (in Serbian and Macedonian)
- Biber i čokolada by Martin Vučić
- Gaćice by Goga Sekulić
- Gubim kontrolu by Goga Sekulić
- Katastrofa by Goga Sekulić
- Seksi biznismen by Goga Sekulić
- Ludača by Jelena Karleuša
- Preživeću by Jelena Karleusa
- Slatka mala by Jelena Karleuša
- Upravo oslavljena by Jelena Karleuša
- Ljubi me by Kaliopi
- Lepa a sama by Kaya
- Budi me by Konstantin Tino Kaysharov and Stevan Tomašević
- Gde sam grešila by Marina Visković
- Čovek mog života by Mia Borisavljević
- Stvarno se isplatilo by Neda Ukraden
- Nije ti dobro (Girls Night) by Neda Ukraden and Clea&Kim
- Neverna by Nikola Burovac
- Crno i zlatno by Seka Aleksić
- Ostrvo tuge by Selma Bajrami
- Promijeni se by Selma Bajrami
- Šta je od Boga, dobro je by Selma Bajrami
- Bakšiš by Selma Bajrami
- Nisam ti oprostila by Selma Bajrami
- Tijelo bez duše by Selma Bajrami
- U zemlji krvi i meda by Selma Bajrami
- Lažni gospodin by Selma Bajrami
- Žena starija by Stoja
- Beograd by Svetlana "Ceca" Ražnatović
- Crveno by Svetlana "Ceca" Ražnatović
- Dokaz by Svetlana "Ceca" Ražnatović
- Fatalna ljubav by Svetlana "Ceca" Ražnatović
- Neodoljiv, neumoljiv by Svetlana "Ceca" Ražnatović
- Nevaljala by Svetlana "Ceca" Ražnatović
- Nije monotonija by Svetlana "Ceca" Ražnatović
- Znam by Svetlana "Ceca" Ražnatović
- Tebe volim by Tamara Todevska, Vrčak and Adrian Gaxha
- Incident by Tanja Savic
- GOOOL by Tijana Dapčević
- Sve je isto samo njega nema by Tijana Dapčević
- Extra by Tina Ivanović
- Imaš me u šaci by Željko Samardžić
- Kako da ne by Mia Borisavljević
- Moj Dragi by Anabela
- Zaborav by Ana Nikolic
- Šef stanice by Models

=== Macedonian ===
- Neka patam / Нека патам by Bravo Band
- Vo imeto na ljubovta / Во името на љубовта by Maja Pančeva
- Jas / Јас by Maja Vukićević
- Pod koža... / Под кожа... by Maja Vukićević
- Priznavam / Признавам by Maja Vukićević
- Sakam da znam / Сакам да знам by Maja Vukićević
- Deža vu / Дежа ву by Sanja and Daskal
- Vo Ime Na Ljubovta / Во Име На Љубовта by Tamara Todevska, Vrčak and Adrian Gaxha
- Belo zname / Бело знаме by Verica Pandilovska
- Životot e / Животот е by Verica Pandilovska
- Povtorno se zaljubuvam vo tebe / Повторно се заљубувам во тебе by Vlado Janevski

=== Albanian ===
- Tribalb by Adelina Ismaili
- Kriza by Berkan
- Maraton by Berkan
- Mandarin by Bleona Qereti
- Prapë se prapë by Gili and Sinan Vllasaliu
- Xhepi by Korab Jetishi
- Amerika by Lori
- Another World by Nora Istrefi (in Albanian and English)
- Ah, moj dashuria ime by Pirro Çako
- Dashuri Mistike by Tamara Todevska, Vrčak and Adrian Gaxha
- Hey! by Tuna

=== Bulgarian ===
- Otzad mini / Отзад мини by Emanuela
- Taralezh / Таралеж by Emanuela
- Rom-pom-pom / Ром-пом-пом by Emanuela
- Mili moy angel moy / Мили мой ангел мой by Emanuela
- Shte ti dam / Ще ти дам by Alisia
- Cherno kafe / Черно кафе by Alisia
- Imame li vrazka / Имаме ли връзка by Alisia
- Na kragal chas / На кръгъл час by Alisia
- Na parvo vreme / На първо време by Dzhina Stoeva
- Piy edna studena voda / Пий една студена вода by Rumina
- Kazah ti / Казах ти by Rumina
- Nomer 2 / Номер 2 by Ivena
- Kato kuchentse / Като кученце by Ivena
- Dats (Zvukat na lyatoto / Дъц (Звукът на лятото) by Ivena
- Dva prasta / Два пръста by Ivena
- Stayata / Стаята by Ivena
- Neshto malko cherno / Нещо малко черно by Ivena
- Nyama da ti pozvolya / Няма да ти позволя by Ivena
- Zhenski nomera / Женски номера by Ivena
- Bez garantsiya / Без гаранция by Ivena
- Stiga veche / Стига вече by Djordan
- Ne drug, a az / Не друг, а аз by Krum
- Dokoga / Докога by Dzhina Stoeva

=== English language ===
- Scandalous by Bleona Qereti
- Go, Never Come Back by Nora Poljoska
- Let Me Love You by Tamara Todevska, Vrčak and Adrian Gaxha

=== Other ===
- The Queen of the Night by Andrea Demirović (in Spanish and English)
- Vo Imya Lyubvi (in Russian) and Yoksun (in Turkish) by Tamara Todevska, Vrčak and Adrian Gaxha
