= Stefan Ravaničanin =

Serbian monk (1670–before 1733)

Stefan Ravaničanin, or Stefan of Ravanica, (1670 – before 1733) was a Serbian educated monk (referred to as daskal, meaning learned, or teacher) who influenced many priests whom he tutored. There is evidence that he was also a jeweler and icon painter. He is best known for a chronology he wrote after participating in the transfer of Prince Lazar of Serbia's relics, called Očevici o velikoj seobi Srba ("witnesses of the Great Migrations of the Serbs") after the Austro-Serbian crusade was defeated by the Turks.

Like the monks of Rača monastery, it is not uncommon for anonymous writers to be referred to by their first name and the name of the place with which their life or work is connected.

Stefan is one of the monks of Ravanica monastery (hence the name "Ravaničanin") who transferred the relics of Prince Lazar of Serbia from Ravanica to Szentendre and after four years from Szentendre to Vrdnik-Ravanica Monastery, in the Fruska Gora mountains, in what is now northern Serbia but then was part of the Habsburg monarchy, or the Holy Roman Empire. He returned to Ravanica in 1718 and there wrote his odyssey in the chronicle Pokazanije kogda prinešen Sv. Lazar veliki knaz serbski iz Serbije v Cesarijsku deržavu i v monastir Vrdnik, posle 1718 ("a look at the transfer of St. Lazar the Grand Duke of Serbia from Serbia to the imperial state and to the monastery of Vrdnik, after 1718"), in which he described his journey and the abandoned Serbian cities, towns, villages, and monasteries, in the wake of a Turkish invasion.

== See also ==
- Arsenije III Crnojević
- Atanasije Daskal
