= Anonymous Ravanićanin =

Anonymous Ravanićanin (fl. 1393–1398) was a writer of the Synaxarian Life of the Holy Prince Lazar, one of the earliest lives about Lazar Hrebeljanović. It is considered the oldest complete Serbian writings on the time of the Battle of Kosovo.

== Life and work ==
As a prince's contemporary and a resident of Ravanica, the writer gives a wealth of historical data (prince's life and reign, his sermon before the battles, Murat's deaths during the battles, siege and capture of the prince and other Serbian rulers, their execution in the Metropolitan Church in Pristina, transfer of Lazarus' relics to Ravanica three years later, a description of Ravanica, etc.), "which did not stifle any literary and artistic value of the writing" (Đorđe Trifunović).

== Translation into modern Serbian ==
- The Life of the Holy Prince Lazarus, translated by Đorđe Trifunović, in "Writings on Kosovo", Belgrade, Prosveta and SKZ, 1993, Stara srpska književnost u 24 knjige, kn. 13.

== Literature ==
- Dimitrije Bogdanović: Istorija stare srpske književnosti, Beograd, SKZ, 1980.
- Đorđe Trifunović: Ravaničanin I, in: "Spisi o Kosovu", Belgrade, Prosveta and SKZ, 1993, Stara srpska književnost u 24 knjige, kn. 13.
- Dejan Mihailović: Byzantine Circle (Small Dictionary of Early Christian Literature in Greek, Byzantine and Old Serbian Literature), Belgrade, "Institute for Textbooks", 2009, p. 141.
