= Moj Dragi =

Single by Anabela

from the album Igra Sudbine
- Released: September, 2009
- Genre: Pop, Dance
- Length: 3:35
- Label: City Records
- Songwriters: Mirko Gavrić, Violeta Pavičević

Anabela singles chronology
"Moj Dragi" (2009)	"100 Ratova" (2010)

"Moj Dragi" (in Serbian Cyrillic: Мој драги, English translation: My darling) is the first single by Bosnian-Serbian singer Anabela Đogani after leaving the duo group Funky G. The song was released in the late 2009 and gain large popularity not just in Serbia, but in Macedonia, Montenegro and Bosnia and Herzegovina too.

== Background ==
Anabela started her career in 1993 in the duo Funky G. In that group she was present together with her now ex-husband Gagi Djogani. They were seventeen years together on the stage and gained a lot of popularity. When they divorced in 2009 Anabela started a solo career. "Moj Dragi" is her first solo single.

== Production history ==
"Moj Dragi" is a Pop song with Dance elements. The music for the song is written by Mirko Gavrić and the lyrics are made by Violeta Pavičević. The song contains samples from the leading single by Tribal King - "Façon Sex".

== Music video ==
The music video for the song was shot in late September, 2009. The director of the video is Dejan Miličević and the video was shot in hotel Radika, Mavrovo, Macedonia. It features Anabela singing in different environments: near a pool, on the bed, in the hotel's halls, etc. In the video there are color and black and white frames. The interesting thing in the video is that a Gucci bear represents "her darling" in the video for the song. It premiered in the middle of October.
