= Andonije Rafail Epaktit =

Writer

Andonije Rafail Epaktit and Andonije Rafail Epaktit of Lepanto (Serbian Cyrillic: Андоније Рафаил Епактит; second half of the 14th century - after 1420) was a Serbian author of Slovo o svetom knezu Lazaru ("Homage to St. Prince Lazar") written in either 1419 or 1420. The specific purpose of Andonije Rafail Epaktit's discourse is to celebrate and glorify Lazar Hrebeljanović, it does not deal succinctly in detail with the Battle of Kosovo itself. Other authors' texts are no different because they all have a religious aura about them, being written by monk-scribes or by Princess Milica of Serbia herself.

Like most of the monk-scribes of the Middle Ages, we know very little about Andonije Rafail Epaktit, only that he was a Greek scribe who lived in Serbia and wrote in Church Slavonic.
