= David (chronicler) =

15th-century Serbian chronicler

David (late 14th – early 15th century) was a Serbian chronicler, successor and processor of the so-called older Serbian chronicle, The Lives and Dwellings of Serbian Kings and Emperors, for which he wrote a long text about Prince Lazar of Serbia between 1402 and 1405: The Pious Prince Lazar. It presents Lazar's life, origin and attitude since he took over the sceptre, his good deeds and virtues, information about the erection of the Church of the Ascension of Christ and, finally, details about the penetration of the Turks and Murat's attack on Kosovo. It is interesting for the development of the Kosovo legend that David is less interested in defeat in Kosovo than in the question "whether betrayal or judgment was God's cause of Lazar's death and defeat" because "fate predestined events in the Middle Ages, and God's punishment explained consequences and catastrophes" (according to literary professor Jelka Ređep). To that extent, because of Lazar's life and nobility, "this personal question of the writer has more intonation of doubt and confusion," (Đorđe Trifunović) so the chronicle is important because of the introduction of the motive of betrayal into the causes of Kosovo's defeat.

== Translation into modern Serbian ==
- Pious Prince Lazar, in "Writings on Kosovo", Belgrade, Prosveta and SKZ, 1993, Old Serbian literature in 24 books, book 13.
