= Ana Rich =

Serbian singer and media personality (born 1983)

- Ана Рич
- Born: 1 January 1983 (age 43); Belgrade, SR Serbia, SFR Yugoslavia
- Other name: Ana Vukićević
- Citizenship: Serbia; Bulgaria
- Education: University of Priština (LLB)
- Occupations: Singer; dancer; choreographer; lawyer
- Years active: 2010–2026
- Height: 173 cm (5 ft 8 in)
- Children: 1
- Awards: Wienne Oscar Of Popularity
- Musical career
- Genres: Pop; dance; Eurodance
- Instrument: Vocals
- Formerly of: Funky G

Ana Vukićević (née Nikolić; Serbian Cyrillic: Ана Вукићевић, née Николић; née Николич; Bulgarian: Ана Вукичевич, romanized: Ana Vukicevich born 1 January 1983), better known as Ana Rich (Serbian: Ана Рич, romanized: Ana Rič), is a Serbian-Bulgarian pop singer, dancer, choreographer and lawyer. Ana Rich was born in Belgrade, SFR Yugoslavia.

== Early life and education ==
Ana Rich was born in Belgrade, at fifteen years of age she started first steps of Jazz dance. As she was very talented she danced in famous dance school Trik FX, with whom she had many public appearances.

Ana attended Dental school in Belgrade, and after graduated in Tourism. After several years, she graduated on Faculty of law at University of Priština.

== Career ==
She released her first single "Duplo golo" in 2010. During 2011, she became part of Funky G, popular Serbian dance music group, alongside Gagi Đogani, who is the leader of the group, and Marija Mijanović, another singer.

After one year of cooperation, five singles, she left Funky G at the end of 2012 and continued her career as a solo singer. The main reason for the termination of cooperation with Funky G was her different view of the band's future, some disagreements with the band leader Gagi Đogani, as well as Ana's wish for independent advancement.

Ana released new single "Daj mi se" in 2013.

She take a part in the Balkan famous singing competition Zvezde Granda in 2018. In the second round she sang two songs, "Rukuju se, rukuju" by former Yugoslav pop rock band Zana and "Da li si to ti" by Ana Kokić. Although she failed to qualify for the third round of competition, she caused a lot of sympathy and shock of the audience and jury, who compared her to the famous Serbian singer and media personality Jelena Karleuša because of her fashion style during the competition.

In 2017, she declared herself a vegetarian, thus emphasizing the rights of animals, she is a member of a many animal welfare organisations as well as a signatory of many petitions about animal rights, she also advocate for free vaccination of abandoned animals

== Television appearances ==
- Zvezde Granda (2017–18) as a competitor

== Discography ==
=== Singles ===
- Jača nego pre Funky G (2012)
- Nije moja ljubav slepa Funky G (2012)
- Zlatna ribica Funky G (2012)
- Godina zmaja Funky G (2012)
- Svidja li ti se moja draga Funky G (featuring Igor x ) (2012)
- Duplo Golo, Ana Rich (2010)
- Daj mi se, Ana Rich (2013)

== Videography ==
- Jača nego pre Funky G (2012)
- Duplo Golo, Ana Rich (2010)
- Daj mi se, Ana Rich (2013)

== Awards and nominations ==
Year	Award	Category	Result	Ref.
2010	Wienne Oscar Of Popularity	Discovery of the year	Won	

== See also ==
- Music of Serbia
- List of singers from Serbia
- Zvezde Granda
- Serbian pop
