= Daskal =

Daskal is a surname. Notable people with the surname include:

- Asher Anshel Daskal (1908–1990), Israeli businessman
- Atanasije Daskal, Serbian medieval chronicler and writer
- Dimitrije Daskal (1660–after 1718), Montenegrin painter
- Jennifer Daskal (born 1972), American lawyer
- Reb Chaim Daskal (1961–2014), Israeli rabbi
