= Anabela (singer) =

Bosnian singer (born 1975)

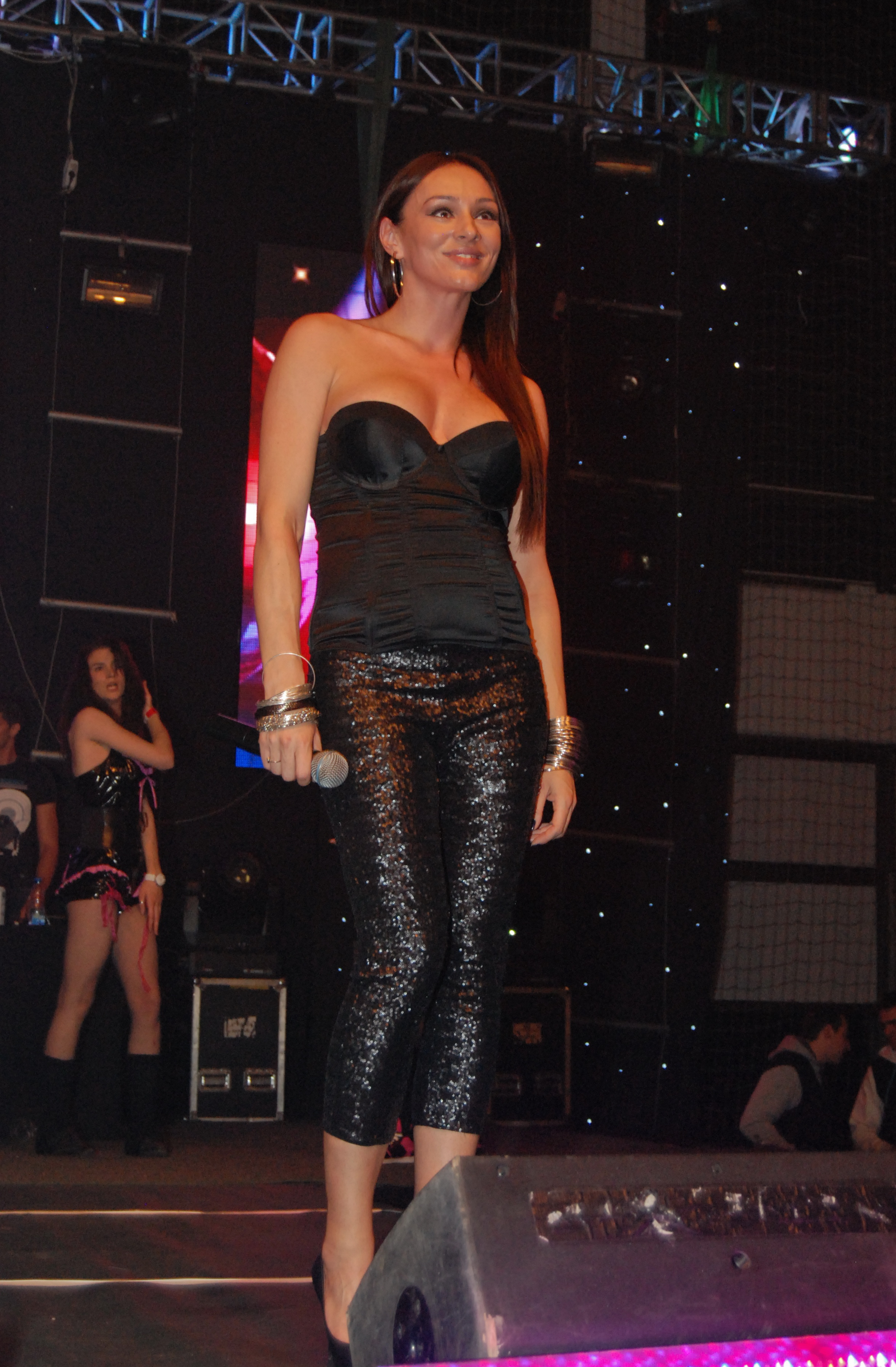
- Anabela in 2011
- Born: Anabela Bukva; 26 January 1975 (age 51); Goražde, SR Bosnia and Herzegovina, SFR Yugoslavia
- Other names: Anabela Đogani; Anabela Funky G
- Citizenship: Bosnia and Herzegovina; Serbia
- Occupations: Singer; songwriter; dancer
- Years active: 1993–present
- Height: 1.70 m (5 ft 7 in)
- Spouses: Gazmen Đogani (m. 1995; div. 2009) Andrej Atijas (m. 2012; div. 2019)
- Children: 3
- Relatives: Aida Bukva (sister)
- Musical career
- Origin: Belgrade
- Genres: Pop; pop-folk; turbo-folk
- Instrument: Vocals
- Labels: City Records; IDJTunes; Grand Production
- Formerly of: Funky G

Anabela Atijas (née Bukva; born 26 January 1975), better known mononymously as Anabela, is a Bosnian singer. She began her professional music career in 1993 as a member of the group Funky G, with whom she released 12 studio albums. After leaving the group in 2009, she began her solo career. Her debut solo single, "Moj dragi", was released in September of that year. In July 2010, she released her first solo studio album Igra sudbine. Since then, she has released several singles, including "Beograd" (2011), a collaboration with Elitni Odredi and DJ Shone.

== Early life ==
Anabela Bukva was born in Goražde, SR Bosnia and Herzegovina, SFR Yugoslavia to a Bosniak father Ahmed Bukva and Bosnian Serb mother Jadranka Polutak. Her parents filed for divorce when she was three or four years old. The divorce was finalized when she began first grade of primary school. It was initially argued in court that Anabela would live with her father because her mother did not have the financial capabilities to care for Anabela. The court did not favor this opinion, but could not make a decision. Instead, the matter was given to Anabela to decide with whom she would live after the divorce. Because of a strong connection with her father, Anabela chose to remain with her father. Anabela describes herself and her father as being a "dream team"; they were inseparable. She was immersed in music from an early age. Her father would play the guitar for her, and the two would often sing duets together.

She grew up with her father's two half-brothers from her paternal grandfather's second marriage. The older half-brother is four years older than Anabela, and the younger Anabela's age. Because they were all close in age, Anabela viewed them as her brothers. She was a self-described tomboy, and practiced karate. She finished her primary education in Goražde, and decided to relocate to Sarajevo at the age of 13 for secondary education in foreign languages. She lived in Sarajevo for two years, having moved between thirteen apartments during her short stay. She has two paternal half-sisters, Ilda and Aida (born 1985), who is an actress.

During winter break in late 1990, Anabela left Bosnia for Switzerland with her boyfriend, Nikola. Shortly after they left, their home country Yugoslavia began breaking up and several wars started, including one in Bosnia. Nikola returned to Bosnia, as his parents had been left behind. He became one of the first victims of the war. Anabela remained in Switzerland for a short period, and could not return to Bosnia because of border closures. She had no family in Switzerland nor contact with family in Bosnia, so she decided to relocate to Belgrade.

Looking for a normal life, she gained some footing in Belgrade through the help of Nikola's family. A refugee from Croatia hired Anabela to work as a secretary in his office. After seeing a commercial advertising for the opening of the Đogani Dance School, she decided to sign up for dance classes. Gazmen "Gagi" Đogani, a dance instructor at the Đogani Dance School, was attracted to Anabela and immediately offered to take her on a date. Anabela described the relationship as an instant love. The duo spent hours choreographing dances to Western songs by popular artists such as Bobby Brown, Michael Jackson and Whitney Houston.

== Career ==
=== 1993–2009: Funky G ===
Gagi decided to create an all-girl music group in 1993. The duo split, both professionally and privately, in 2009. Anabela continued her career as a solo singer. Montenegrin singer Nenad Knežević Knez and Serbian rapper Milan 011 wrote a song for the group, called Samo u snu. Knez questioned Gagi's choice of having many different girls performing in the group, instead opting to have just Anabela perform. Gagi agreed on a whim and asked Anabela to join his group, Funky G. Although liking the idea, she was reluctant to do it. The duo eventually recorded a video for the song Samo u snu. Having received an invitation to come, Anabela decided to move to Sweden to live with her mother. She gained refugee status in Sweden, and began attending school. In the meantime, Gagi replaced Anabela with another woman. Within a few months, Gagi began repeatedly calling Anabela during her stay in Sweden, informing her of the success of their single throughout the clubs in Serbia. Gagi begged Anabela to return to Serbia immediately to perform at a concert in the famed Sava Center. Anabela did not immediately believe Gagi, and remained skeptical. Gagi sent Anabela a banknote as proof that he was earning money on behalf of her own work. Still unconvinced, Anabela, by chance, watched a report on CNN on the nightlife of Belgrade's youth during a time of economic sanctions. Many different nightclubs were showcased in the report, and in several of them, Anabela heard the song she and Gagi had earlier made. Finally believing Gagi, she reluctantly agreed to come back despite having been awarded refugee status. Anabela was shocked by the celebrity status she had gained in Belgrade. The public started to associate Funky G with Anabela. In an effort to appease fans, Anabela decided to attend vocal schooling to improve her singing ability and provide vocals in subsequent Funky G releases.

After the release of Funky G's second album in 1995, Anabela unexpectedly became pregnant. Gagi, after hearing the news, was indifferent about the pregnancy. However, after hearing the baby's heartbeat on the ultrasound, Gagi became excited about his first child. In preparation for the baby's delivery, Gagi and Anabela saved money to purchase an apartment of their own. Anabela gave birth to her daughter Luna in 1996. She later miscarried twins, and had trouble getting pregnant thereafter. She sought the help of fertility doctors, aiding her in becoming pregnant with her second daughter, Nina.

=== 2009–present: Breakup and solo career ===
Marital problems between Anabela and Gagi became evident following Nina's birth in 2005. After a long period of instability in the relationship, the marriage ended in April 2009 and Anabela subsequently left Funky G to start a solo career. Anabela was married to a Bosnian Jewish businessman Andrej Atijas. Atijas lived in Serbia where he studied, and his mother lives in Pančevo. They have one daughter together, Blankica Atijas born 20 May 2013 in Sarajevo. They divorced in 2019, but remained close. After living in Sarajevo for a year, Anabela returned to live in Belgrade.

She has citizenship in both Bosnia and Herzegovina and Serbia.

After the divorce and leaving the group Funky G, Anabela started a solo career and the realization of her first independent album at the end of 2009. In September 2009, she recorded and released the song Moj dragi, which is also her first song in her solo career. Soon after, in October 2009, Anabela released her first duet Sto ratova with Mia Borisavljević. At the beginning of 2010, Anabela entered the reality show Big Brother to promote herself and her solo career. She leaves the reality show with second place. After leaving the reality show, Anabela continues to work on her first studio album.

On 21 July 2010, Anabela's first solo album titled Igra sudbine was released for the publishing house City Records, which won the hearts of the audience throughout the region and achieved great hits. CD was sold in a circulation of 50,000 copies.

After a more than successful start to her solo career, Anabela continues to release singles, so in 2011 she released songs; Ne zovi me, Paparazzi with Mirko Gavrić and Beograd with Elitni Odredi and DJ Shone, which is a huge success in the Balkans and has over 50 million views on the YouTube platform, which makes Anabela’s most successful project in her career.

In 2012, Anabela participated in the Grand Festival with the song Lutka bez ruku and not long after that she collaborated with Mirko Gavrić and Zile for the song Ljubi, ljubi. In the same year, she met businessman Andrej Atijas, married him and soon became pregnant. In May 2013, she gave birth to her third daughter, Blankica, and shortly after giving birth, she released the single Lujke moje.

The following year, in 2014, she performed and participated in Pink Music Festival with the song Muzej promašenih ljubavi.

In September 2015, Anabela entered the reality show program Farma, but her participation ended abruptly due to an illness caused by the poor hygienic conditions of the premises of the reality show. Anabela leaves the Farma after 7 days and returns to releasing songs. In November, she releases the song Noćna patrola, which becomes a big hit, followed by two duets for the songs Preventiva with Boban Rajović and U mraku with Đuka Đuranović.

In 2016, the songs Emotivo labilna and the collaboration Bidermajer with the group Luna. In 2017, together with Zoran Iliev, she performed at the Macedonian festival MakFest with the song Od utro do večer and won first place. And after that, in the same year, she releases the single Zabranjeno.

In 2018, she had a comeback single Vila veštica with the group Funky G, but she did not stay in that line-up for long. In 2020, she enters the reality program Zadruga, where she wins 4th place.

In the period from 2020-2023 she released the singles Ples sa vukovima, Ja sve, ti ne with Nenad Dimitrović and the single U januaru.

== Discography ==
=== Studio albums ===
with Funky G

- Samo u snu (1994)
- Mi smo tu (1995)
- Budi tu (1996)
- Hej, ti (1997)
- Supersonic (1998)
- Tebi (1999)
- Dođe mi da… (2000)
- Napraviću lom (2001)
- Napravi se lud (2002)
- Nedodirljiva (2005)
- Osmi smrtni greh (2007)
- Kafana na Balkanu (2008)

solo

- Igra sudbine (2010)

=== Non-album singles ===
- DJ pumpaj! (feat. MC Stojan) (2010)
- Paparazzi (feat. Mirko Gavrić) (2011)
- Ne zovi me (2011)
- Beograd (feat. DJ Shone & Elitni Odredi) (2011)
- Lutka bez ruku (2012)
- Ljubi, ljubi (feat. Mirko Gavrić & Zile) (2012)
- Lujke moje (2013)
- Muzej promašenih ljubavi (2014)
- Ljubav zna (feat. MC Knele & DJ Matejo) (2014)
- U mraku (feat. Đuka Đuranović) (2015)
- Preventiva (feat. Boban Rajović) (2015)
- Noćna patrola (2015)
- Bidermajer (feat. Grupa Luna) (2016)
- Emotivno labilna (2016)
- Zabranjeno (2017)
- Od utro do večer (feat. Zoran Iliev) (2017)
- Ples sa vukovima (2020)
- Ja sve, ti ne (feat. Necone) (2022)
- U januaru (2023)
