= Dzhina Stoeva =

Dzhina Stoeva Джина Стоева
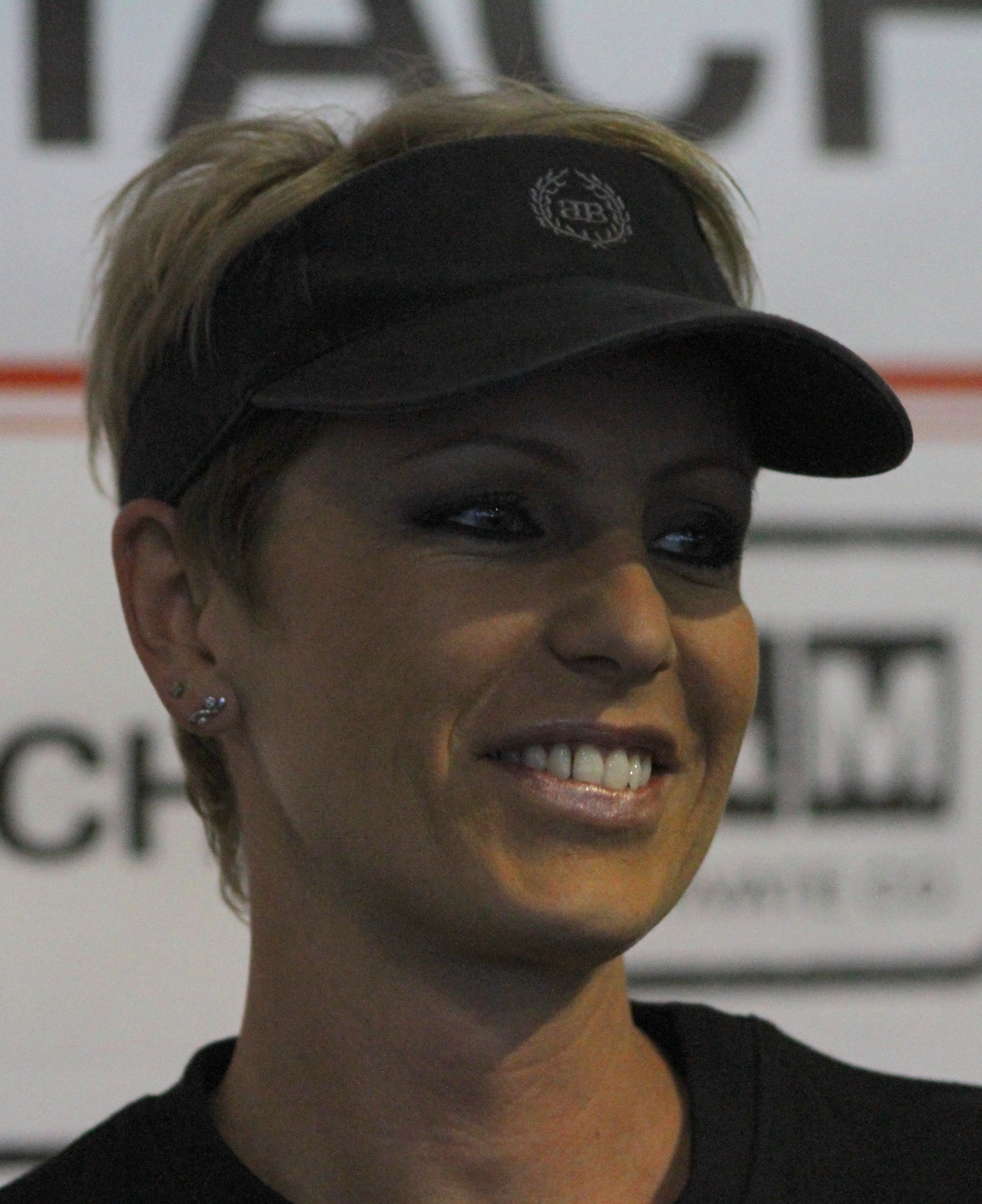

Background information
- Birth name: Desislava Velcheva Stoeva
- Born: 6 September 1976 (age 48); Ruse, Bulgaria
- Years active: 2000–present
- Labels: Ara Music

Desislava Velcheva Stoeva (Bulgarian: Десислава Велчева Стоева; born 6 September 1976) is a Bulgarian pop folk and folk singer

== Biography ==
Desislava Stoeva was born in Ruse, Bulgaria.

In 2000, she signed a contract with Ara Music. In 2001, was released her debut album Любов моя.

In 2014, her second folklore album Чашо моя was released. In 2015, she left Ara Music and switched to an independent label.

On 28 February 2017, she gave birth to her daughter, Ivaya.

== Discography ==
=== Studio albums ===
- Любов моя (My Love; 2001)
- Така желана (So Desired; 2003)
- Изкушение (Temptation; 2007)
- Пиринско слънце (Pirin Sun; 2008)
- Неизлечимо влюбена (Incurably in Love; 2009)
- Чашо моя (Oh, My Glass; 2014)

=== Compilations ===
- The Best of Jina Stoeva – The Nightmare (2012)
