= Atanasije Daskal =

Serbian medieval chronicler and writer

Atanasije Daskal also known as Atanasije Daskal Srbin or Atanasije daskal the Serb (lived in the late seventeenth- and early eighteenth-century) was a Serbian medieval chronicler and writer. His writings documented the tragedy of a nation lost in alien-occupied Serbian lands when the Ottoman Empire began its conquest of Old Serbia.

== Biography ==
Atanasije Daskal the Serb lived at the time of the migration of Serbs under Arsenije III Čarnojević. Probably as a hieromonk at Oreskovica Monastery he moved to the north, near the border of Hungary, after the Austrian defeat by the Turks, went to Komoran as a Serbian teacher and later travelled to Imperial Russia.

== Writings ==
Atanasije Daskal wrote a book in Russian about the Serbian emperors and the Turkish war against the Christian emperor and the abandoned Serbian land (1689), comparing the glorious times of Serbian history with the war-ravaged Serbia and the sufferings of its inhabitants, whom he himself witnessed. In some places, his writing grows into a poignant cry in which the sound of Jeremiah Lamenting the Destruction of Jerusalem is felt as he watches the ruin of Jerusalem or the bleak record of Inok Isaiah over a devastated Serbia after the March defeat. The writing is dedicated to the "imperial and grand princess" Sofia, sister of Peter the Great, probably with the intention of reminding the Russian court to intervene and help liberate Serbs from the Turkish yoke. In addition to these writings of Atanasije Daskal, he also attached a biographical note on the copyist of the books of Abraham and the zealous reader of the seventeenth century Ananias, also in connection with the circumstances of the war.

His work has been translated into modern Serbian and Petar Milosavljević included an abridgment of Atanasije Daskal's Knjiga o srpskim carevima (The Book of Serbian Emperors) in his "Anthology of Serbian Poetry (Old Poetry)", Belgrade, SKZ and BIGZ, 1992.

== See also ==
- Arsenije III Crnojević
- Stefan Ravaničanin
- Cyril Hopovac
