= Vrdnik-Ravanica Monastery =

Monastery in Serbia

Coordinates: 45°07′42″N 19°47′04″E

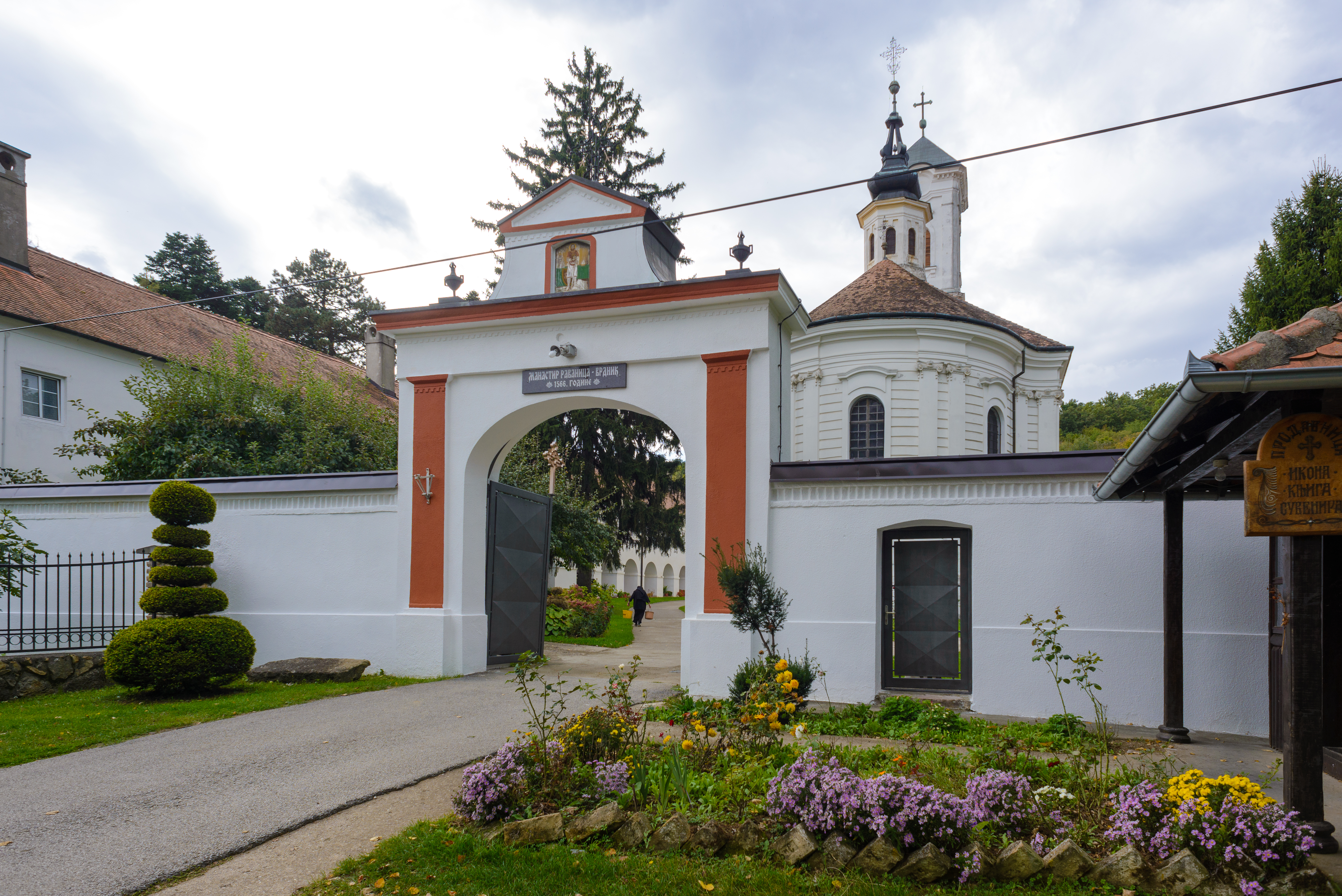
Vrdnik-Ravanica Monastery

The Vrdnik-Ravanica Monastery (Serbian: Манастир Врдник-Раваница, romanized: Manastir Vrdnik-Ravanica), also known as Little Ravanica (Мала Раваница / Mala Ravanica), is a Serbian Orthodox monastery in Vrdnik in the Fruška Gora mountains in the northern Serbia, in the province of Vojvodina. The exact date of its founding is unknown. The records indicate that the church was built at the time of Metropolitan Serafim Jovanović, in the second half of the 16th century. The present church in the monastery was constructed in the period from 1801 to 1811. The icons on the altar screen and the vaults were painted by Dimitrije Avramović in 1853.

Vrdnik-Ravanica Monastery was declared Monument of Culture of Exceptional Importance in 1990, and it is protected by the state.

== See also ==
- List of Serbian Orthodox monasteries
