= Funky G =

Serbian dance music duo

- Origin: Belgrade, Serbia
- Genres: Electronic; electropop; dance; dance-pop; pop; turbo-folk
- Years active: 1993–2013; 2018
- Labels: Zmex; MAT; PGP-RTS; CentroScena; Košava; City Records; Gold Music
- Members: Gagi Đogani
- Past members: Anabela; Marina Uzelac; Ana Rich; Marija Miljanović

Funky G was a Serbian dance music duo. The duo consisted of Anabela and Gagi Đogani. They released a total of 13 studio albums, three compilation albums and several singles. They held two major concerts in the Sava Centar and recorded over 30 high-budget music videos.

Dragan "Gagi" Đogani and Anabela Bukva founded the Funky G in 1993, before marrying in 1995. They released their first single "Dance je uvek u fazonu" in 1993, and the following year, in 1994, their first studio album Samo u snu. The title track became their first hit.

Anabela and Gagi released together a total of twelve studio albums and three compilation albums. They held a concert twice in the Sava Centar. After her divorce from Gagi in April 2009, Anabela left the group and embarked on a solo career, while Gagi looked for a new singer.

In December 2009, the 13th studio album, Pali anđeo, was released with Marina Uzelac as the vocalist. Uzelac was in the group until 2011, when she was replaced Ana Rich. Gagi and Rich released only a few singles and Rich left the group at the end of 2012.

At the beginning of October 2018, Anabela and Gagi reformed with the comeback song "Vila veštica", but split up again after.

== Discography ==
=== Albums ===
- Samo u snu (1994)
- Mi smo tu (1995)
- Budi tu (1996)
- Hej, ti (1997)
- Supersonic (1998)
- Tebi (1999)
- Dođe mi da… (2000)
- Napraviću lom (2001)
- Napravi se lud (2002)
- Nedodirljiva (2005)
- Osmi smrtni greh (2007)
- Kafana na Balkanu (2008)
- Pali anđeo (2009)

=== Non-album singles ===
- Arogantna kraljica (2010)
- Jača nego pre (2011)
- Godina zmaja (2012)
- Nije moja ljubav slepa (2012)
- Zlatna ribica (2012)
- Sviđa li ti se moja draga (feat. Igor X) (2012)
- Puče puška (2013)
- Vila veštica (2018)

=== Compilations ===
- Najveći hitovi (2000)
- The Best of Funky G / 1994 - 2003 (2003)
- Retro collection (2009)

== Videography ==
- Dance je uvek u fazonu (1993)
- Samo u snu (1994)
- Sutra je novi dan (1994)
- Kad ne mogu da napustim grrrrad (1994)
- Plakati zauvek (1995)
- Da li znaš (1995)
- Kad sam bio mali (1995)
- Sve što želim (1995)
- Njen grad (1995)
- Budi tu (1996)
- Tvoja ljubav (1996)
- Neću nikog (1996)
- Dugo plakala (1997)
- Sex (1997)
- Supersoničan je ritam (PC Voice Mix) (1998)
- Dala bih sve (1999)
- Gromovi (1999)
- E, baš neću (2000)
- Igraj (2001)
- Napraviću lom (2002)
- Robinja (2002)
- Napravi se lud (2002)
- Legenda (2002)
- Ja imam nekog (feat. Deen) (2003)
- U tvojim kolima (feat. Juice) (2005)
- Ponovo (2005)
- Je l’ ti žao (2007)
- Šta ti mogu (2007)
- Veštica iz Srbije (feat. Vrčak) (2008)
- Kafana na Balkanu (2008)
- Biće mi teško (Part II) (2009)
- Pali anđeo (2010)
- Šakom o sto (2010)
- Arogantna kraljica (2010)
- Jača nego pre (2013)
- Vila veštica (2018)
