= Ljubostinja =

Serbian Orthodox monastery in Trstenik, Serbia

Coordinates: 43.651554°N 20.997694°E

Ljubostinja Monastery
- Манастир Љубостиња
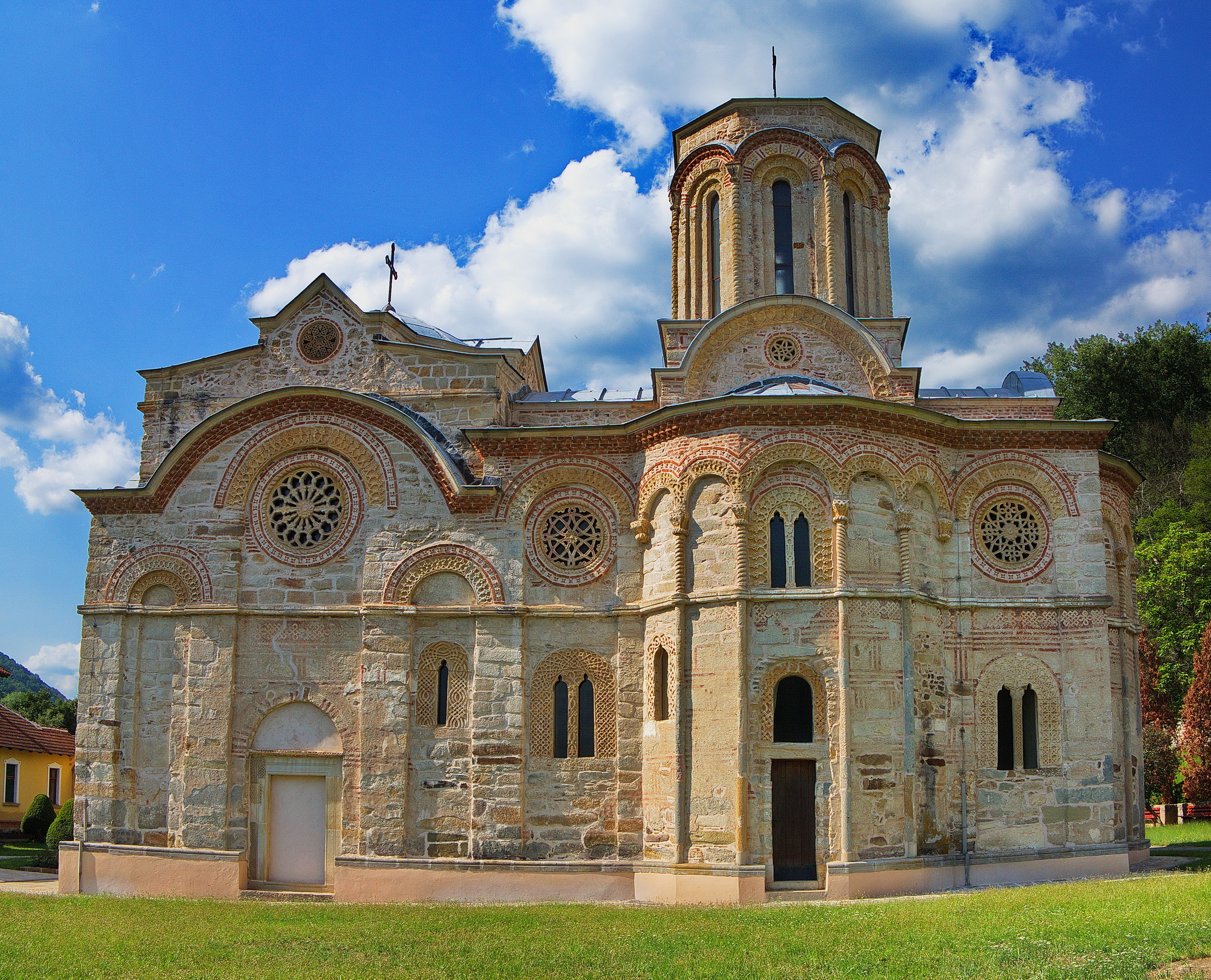
- South side of the monastery church
- Interactive map of Ljubostinja Monastery

Monastery information
- Order: Serbian Orthodox Church
- Established: 1388
- Dedication: Dormition of the Mother of God
- Diocese: Eparchy of Kruševac

People
- Founder: Princess Milica
- Important associated figures: Prince Lazar, Nun Jefimija, Despot Stefan

Architecture
- Status: Active
- Architect: Rade Borović (Rade Neimar)
- Style: Morava architectural school Influences: Venetian Gothic; Islamic architecture

Site
- Location: Prnjavor (Trstenik), Trstenik
- Country: Serbia

Cultural Heritage of Serbia
- Official name: Манастир Љубостиња
- Type: Monument of Culture of Exceptional Importance
- Designated: 1979
- Reference no.: СК 163

The Ljubostinja Monastery (Serbian: Манастир Љубостиња, romanized: Manastir Ljubostinja) is located on the left bank of the West Morava river, 4 kilometers north of Trstenik, in the area of the village of Prnjavor (Trstenik). It belongs to the Eparchy of Kruševac of the Serbian Orthodox Church. It was built on the eve of the Battle of Kosovo, at the end of 1388, as the first female monastery in Serbia. It is the endowment of Princess Milica, who, according to legend, saw Prince Lazar here for the first time, when a mutual love was born between them simultaneously - hence, according to one theory, the name of the monastery (ljubvestin - place of love). The princess took her monastic vows in Ljubostinja in 1392, and spent the rest of her life here, together with her friend, the medieval Serbian writer, Despotess Jelena Mrnjavčević - later nun Jefimija. Both are buried in the monastery, where their relics are still kept today. At one point, the relics of Saint Petka were also kept in Ljubostinja, as the greatest material and spiritual treasure of the Serbian Despotate.

The head of the monastery was Abbess Hristina (Obradović), with the sisterhood, who was in charge from 21 May 1995 to 2026.

At the end of the 14th century, the sanctuary first became a gathering place for the remaining aristocracy of Moravian Serbia, because it accepted the widows of the Serbian nobility as new nuns, and then a hub of Serbian diplomacy, since Princess Milica - then already nun Evgenija - remained the de facto ruler until her death in 1405. During the 18th century and 19th century, Ljubostinja was one of the five richest monasteries in Serbia, known as the home of prominent and influential abbots, and since the 20th century - as a bastion of female monasticism.

The monastery was built in the style of the Morava architectural school, which here uniquely unified the influences of Venetian Gothic and Islamic architecture. It is recognizable by its rose windows, stone ornaments in the shape of blooming lilies, and other floral shapes that symbolize heavenly vegetation, adding a theological expression to the architecture, evoking the builders' intention to set the composition of Ljubostinja as the temple of the Dormition of the Mother of God, situated in the ambiance of a heavenly garden or the Garden of Eden. Resembling ancient palaces, the frescoes are painted with cold color tones - mostly cinnabar-red and malachite-green. The most famous among them depicts Jesus's Healing the paralytic at Bethesda.

As a Monument of Culture of Exceptional Importance, the last endowment of the Nemanjić dynasty, the mausoleum of Princess Milica, and an ossuary with over thirty discovered monastic and noble graves, Ljubostinja has enjoyed the highest degree of protection from the Republic of Serbia since 1979. The abbess of the monastery since 1995 is Mother Hristina (Obradović), and the parish priest is Father Danijel (Stefanović). Folk assemblies are held in the monastery courtyard on the Transfiguration and the Dormition of the Mother of God, as well as the event Jefimija's Days.

== History ==
According to the words of Abbot Sevastijan Putnik, Ljubostinja is one of the largest Serbian monasteries with the least amount of written historical data. More notes exist only from 1780. Most of the prose about the fate of the monastery from the time of its creation to the 21st century has been reconstructed based on cadastral, church, and other records.

=== Three interpretations of the name ===
There are three interpretations of the name given to the monastery.

According to the oldest tradition, on the site of today's monastery, there was once a small church dedicated to Saint Archdeacon Stephen, around which a public assembly (fair) was held every 2 August, on the translation of the relics of this saint. Vratko Nemanjić - Jug Bogdan in folk tradition - had his vineyards on the surrounding hills, so one of them is still called Bogdanovo (Bogdanjsko) brdo, and the village on it - Bogdanje. Once, Prince Lazar came to the assembly, and there he met Jug-Bogdan's daughter, the young Milica, a noblewoman from the ruling lineage. At that moment, love was born between them, which Milica nurtured by visiting the August assembly every year, and gifting the church with various presents. Wanting to preserve an eternal memory of the idyllic place where she met her husband, she decided to build a magnificent temple instead of a small church, which would serve the Virgin Mary, but also act as a memory of their love. Hence the portmanteau ljubvestan ↔ ljubvostin → ljubostinja - place of love, the place where love dwells, where it was born, where it smolders, the place of a romantic meeting.

The second interpretation relates to the word ljubo-pustinja (love for the desert), i.e., love for the ascetic life. The early Middle Ages saw the flourishing of the city of Županjevac in Serbia, near present-day Ljubostinja. Županjevac had its own bazaar and was one of the centers of trade in Pomoravlje. Outside the city walls, but near its roads, an unusually large number of hermits lived in the valleys and sketes of the Gledić Mountains at that time. The third interpretation says that the sanctuary got its name from a toponym - ljupka stena (lovely rock), since it is located below the Gledić Mountains and the Samar peak.

=== Princess Milica ===
According to one of the legends, Princess Milica built Ljubostinja in the valley of small mountain streams, the Ljubostinja and Sušica rivers, at the place where she, as a girl - then Milica Nemanjić - first saw Prince Lazar. The monastery is surrounded on three sides by the hills of the Gledić Mountains - to the north is Iver, to the west is Tatarna, and to the east is Kamađore (Kamidžor). Work on the foundations of Ljubostinja began in 1388. After the fatal losses at the Maritsa (1371) and Kosovo (1389), the Princess's idea was for this building to host the widows from Serbian noble families. Thus, the first female monastery in Serbia was founded.

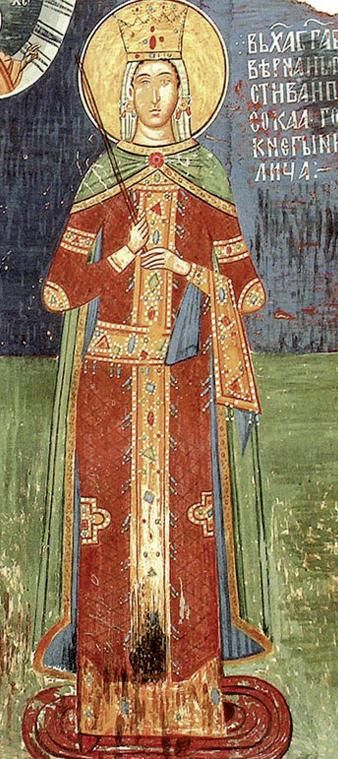
Fresco of Princess Milica from Ljubostinja (15th century).

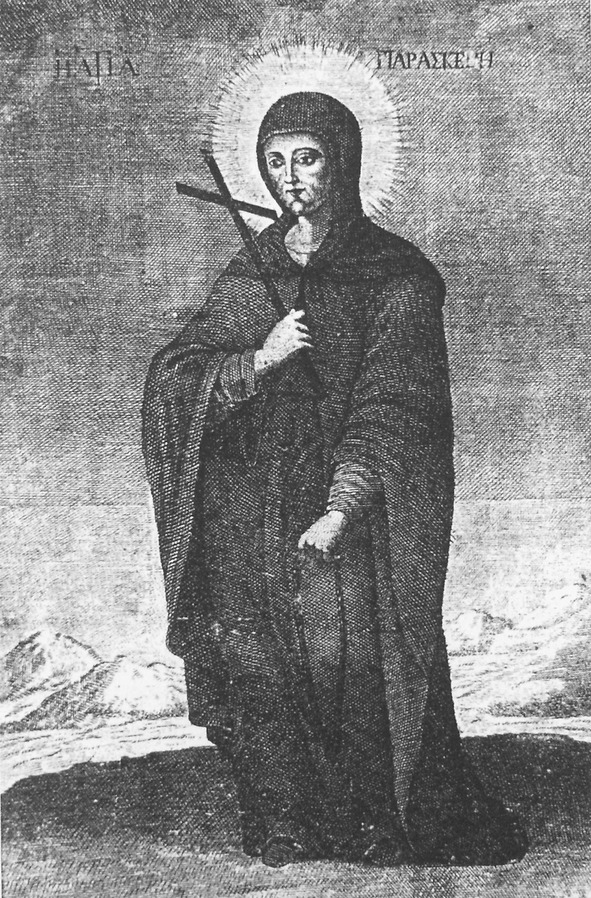
Kept in Ljubostinja (1400-1407), the relics of Saint Petka were the most precious relic in the country.

The first among them was Jelena Mrnjavčević, the widow of Uglješa Mrnjavčević, who took monastic vows after the Battle of Maritsa and the death of her husband, taking the name Jefimija. The two noblewomen, Milica and Nun Jefimija, continued and strengthened their friendship later, in their shared monastic days, when exactly in Ljubostinja Jefimija embroidered the Praise to Prince Lazar with gilded threads, one of the most significant works of medieval Serbian literature.

In the period from the Battle of Kosovo in 1389 until 1393 and the enthronement of her son, Despot Stefan Lazarević, on the Serbian throne, Princess Milica ruled Serbia as regent. Ljubostinja Monastery, where she spent most of her time, was essentially the gathering place for the remaining authority and diplomacy in Serbia, so its history is closely tied to the last years of Milica's life. With the completion of this last endowment of the Nemanjić dynasty, according to historians, the crown was placed on Milica's activity of preserving and continuing the Nemanjić and Lazar's cultural, spiritual, and political legacy.

Reliquary with the relics of Princess Milica

Chronicles record that the ruler visited and very carefully oversaw the work of the builders. She dedicated the monastery to the Dormition of the Mother of God and opened a transcription school within it. With Stefan's rise to power, Princess Milica took monastic vows, took the name Evgenija, and completely withdrew to Ljubostinja. With this act, her reputation and power did not diminish, but on the contrary - became even greater, since Milica, although in a monastery, still took upon herself a part of Serbian diplomatic relations. This is evidenced by the letters she received as a Ljubostinja nun from Dubrovnik, where the people of Dubrovnik continued to address her following court codex, with "glorious and most honorable lady", "magnanimous lady", "glorious and highly respected lady", "lady princess of Raška and Novo Brdo". Constantine of Kostenets writes that she was "not only a woman, but also a wise Odysseus". In 1398, together with Jefimija, she went to Serres to ask her angered son-in-law, Sultan Bayezid I, for forgiveness for her son Stefan, who had been accused of collaborating with the Hungarians. She returned from there with a promise that Bayezid would forgive Stefan, but also with the relics of Saint Petka, which she requested and received from the Sultan. The saint's relics were first kept in the Županjevac monastery, before being transferred to Ljubostinja. Gregory Tsamblak notes that the transfer of the relics of the Byzantine saint was celebrated as the slava of all of Serbia, and writes that "the Serbian land found an inexhaustible wealth", "the protector of the Serbian scepter".

Towards the end of their lives, both nuns took the vow of the Great Schema, and received new monastic names - Milica, i.e., Nun Evgenija, became Schema-nun Efrosinija, while Jefimija received the name Evpraksija. Princess Milica was called empress (Milica) even during her lifetime, and witnessed her own cult that the people cultivated over time, respecting her as a princess, the eldest nun, widow of a former ruler, and mother of a future ruler. Princess Milica was the de facto first abbess of Ljubostinja. It is not known which of the Kosovo widows took over that position after Milica's death, and before the monastery would become a male one.

Milica died before her friend, on 11 November 1405, and was buried in a sarcophagus on the left side. Although Jefimija died in 1406, a few months after the monastery's founder, she was buried in the founder's tomb, on the right side in the narthex. Their relics are still kept in the monastery today, as are the relics of Jefimija's son, Stefan Mrnjavčević. The original fresco painting was created precisely at that time, most likely between 1405 and 1409, i.e., at the latest by the split between her sons, Stefan and Vuk. The church was painted by the Greek painter Makarije Zograf from Zrze (not to be confused with Hieromonk Makarije). After the death of both nuns, Despot Stefan took the relics of Saint Petka and transferred them from Ljubostinja to Kalemegdan, most likely on 8 August according to the new calendar, 1406/1407.

In 1418, Ljubostinja became a male monastery. The first restoration of the monastery was carried out in 1448, and the second in 1661. During archaeological excavations, a hoard of coins (of foreign origin) was found beneath the altar floor, which was used in the restoration of Ljubostinja in the 17th century. The oldest known abbots of Ljubostinja Monastery were Simeon (mentioned in 1481), another Simeon (records from 1576 and 1581) and Isaija (in 1643). There are records that during their time, the monastery also celebrated the translation of the relics of Saint Archdeacon Stephen (2 August according to the calendar at the time), which later hinted to many historians the authenticity of the legend about the small church that united the ruling couple Hrebeljanović.

=== Age of devastation ===
It was a long-held incorrect belief that Ljubostinja was deserted throughout the entire 17th century. Sevastijan Putnik records the oldest memories of the locals of the Trstenik area, who passed down the legend that for a whole century, during the day, only cuckoos could be heard from Ljubostinja, and when night fell - owls, which inhabited the bell tower and ruined domes. Services in Ljubostinja were continuously held from its founding until the Great Migrations of the Serbs (1690), as evidenced by records from 1643 and 1673. At the end of the 17th century, the monastery did become deserted, but it was revived again at the beginning of the 18th century.

In 1732, a theological-monastic school in Ljubostinja under the direction of Father Arsenije is mentioned. Namely, Abbot Arsenije "Ljubostinjski", who managed the monastery from (circa) 1720 to 1736, was one of the most prominent spiritual fathers of his time, whom priests and monks from all over Serbia came to for instruction. He was the first abbot of the monastery whose life was at least somewhat known, and the first to set the framework of expectations for subsequent heads of the monastery regarding the reputation and influence they ought to enjoy among the people and the Church. After him, and in support of the theory that Ljubostinja was deserted, Arsenije "Vtori" ("the second", probably after Arsenije "Ljubostinjski" - "the first") is mentioned, who around 1780 cleared the thicket that had grown on the very roof of the church, cleaned the interior of dirt, chased away sheep that grazed in the monastery, and covered the church with shingles.

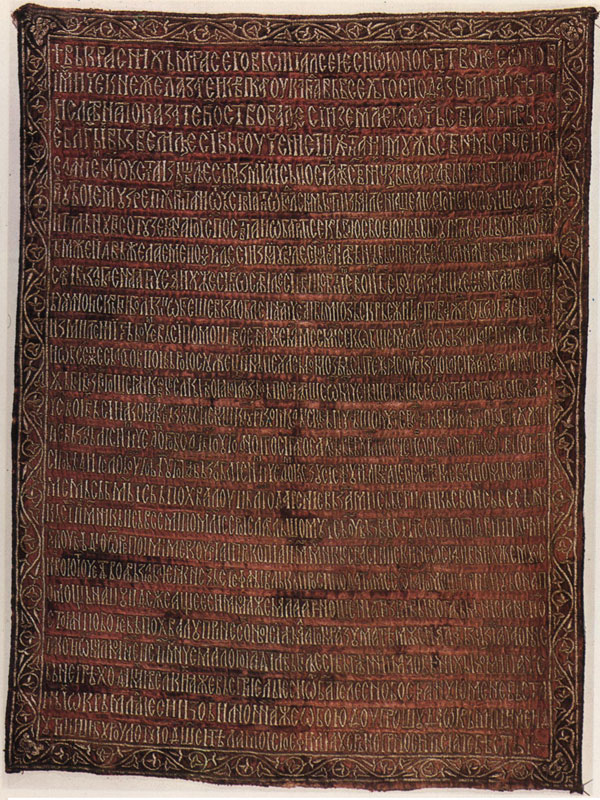
Praise to Prince Lazar is today kept in the Museum of the Serbian Orthodox Church.

The monastery played a major role during the Austro-Turkish War (1788–1791) and Koča's Frontier (1788-1791), when the monks of Ljubostinja helped the Austrians against the Turks. Abbot Vićentije (Jovanović) admitted that between 1781 and 1788 he hid Austrian soldiers, officers, and spies in the monastery. It was from here that the Serbian people were called to an uprising. According to some sources, Koča Anđelković hid in Ljubostinja after the collapse of the rebellion, although this claim is often disputed. The Turks burned and plundered the monastery in retaliation in the first days of May 1788. At that time, most of the original frescoes were destroyed. Also, when the monastery was burned down, a secret treasury was discovered hidden in the monastery wall behind an icon, where Princess Milica kept her treasure. Among the looted valuables was the crown of Prince Lazar, hidden for 400 years. The Turks took it from Ljubostinja to Istanbul, where it remains today. Soon after, the abbot and other monks abandoned the monastery. This completed eighteen years of Vićentije's leadership (1770-1788). Ljubostinja became deserted, but even empty it was plundered once more in 1804, right before the First Serbian Uprising.

The monastery was not without monks for long. Already during the First Serbian Uprising, the combative priest Nastasije "Kazak" (or "Kozak" - he associated with the Russians and Cossacks), took over the management of the monastery, about whom it is recorded that he was vicious and cruel in defending the monastery's property from enemy assaults. Abbot Nastasije organized hajduk bands and attacked the Turks alongside Karađorđe. His fate remained unknown, since a certain priest Spasoje is already mentioned as the administrator of Ljubostinja in 1807.

Although history teaches that Ljubostinja was abandoned in the period between 1788 and roughly 1804, one study states that the church's frescoes were restored for the third time in 1799. It is not known for sure whether Ljubostinja was truly deserted, whether someone from the old monastery brethren repainted the church, or if it was an unknown wandering painter. The fact remains that next to the sarcophagus of Princess Milica, there is a single fresco from 1799, which simply says: Dimitri Basa, servant of God.

=== Age of prosperity ===
During the nineteenth century, Ljubostinja Monastery enjoyed great favor from the ruling House of Obrenović, whose members gifted it on multiple occasions. Besides this, it appeared that Princess Milica's endowment was a favorite among the metropolitans of that era, who frequently stayed there. The nineteenth century in the monastery was also marked by the administration of five enterprising abbots (Arsenije, Meletije, Janićije, Danilo, and Venijamin), who rebuilt one of the five richest monasteries in the country from a ruined and plundered sanctuary.

Miloš's konak is today one of the oldest in Serbia.

During the time of Prince Miloš Obrenović and Abbot Arsenije (Stefanović), Ljubostinja was restored. The beginnings of Arsenije's administration in 1819 were marked by bloodshed. Namely, a tradition of gathering the people on Saint George's Day was established in the monastery. On that holiday in 1819, a murder occurred in the monastery courtyard among the feuding people, after which the monks decided to abolish the St. George's Day assembly. Arsenije built another konak in the courtyard, known today as Miloš's konak. While timber was being collected for its porch, woodcutters found an old ambon in an old oak in the forest near the monastery, on which the Nemanjić double-headed eagle was engraved. According to folk tales, the ambon was found when a beech tree was cut down to make monastery sleds. The ambon is now located in the naos of the monastery church. The abbot also built a watermill, and in 1822 erected an iconostasis with the help of priest Nićifor.

Archimandrite Meletije (Marković), who managed Ljubostinja between 1835 and 1842, followed in the footsteps of his predecessor, so he provided the monastery, squeezed between the hills, with much-needed arable and fertile land for fields and pastures. He bought three watermills and built another, began constructing a protective wall around the courtyard, and covered the church with roof tiles. During his time, in the summer of 1839, the transfer of the relics of Stefan the First-Crowned from Kalenić to Studenica was organized, and the king's relics spent the night in the Ljubostinja church on 20 August.

With the coming of the Defenders of the Constitution to power, retaliation occurred against numerous clergymen who were supporters of the Obrenovićs. Archimandrite Meletije was one of the first to experience this. He was first sent on Penance to the Rača Monastery, only to be allowed to return to Ljubostinja in 1843, but not as an administrator. That position was taken by Abbot Makarije (Petrović). For unknown reasons, Meletije even fled to Austria, from where, with the blessing and forgiveness of the Church, he returned to Ljubostinja in 1845, and took over the management of the monastery from Makarije, which lasted until 1847, when he became the Bishop of Šabac.

He was succeeded by Janićije (Mačužić) - secular name Joanikije Obradović - during whose tenure Ljubostinja experienced the peak of its prosperity. With the rank of archimandrite, Janićije built a bell tower, auxiliary buildings, a kitchen, stables, a cooperage, and a watermill between 1850 and 1851. By the following year, the monastery owned eight watermills, and meadows and orchards reaching to the very banks of the West Morava. Mačužić, with the help of Prince Aleksandar Karađorđević, also built a bell tower. On two occasions - in 1848 and 1851 - the temple was reconstructed. The upper part of the church was repaired, especially the false domes above the narthex. According to the writings of Joakim Vujić, Ljubostinja of that time had a main dome above the naos, and four small domes above the narthex. The executors of the reconstruction work were Jan Nevole, an engineer of the Ministry of Internal Affairs (Serbia), and stonecutter Vujica Petronijević. Sometime during the monastery's restoration, in the mid-century, the botanist Josif Pančić visited the Ljubostinja estates, taking an interest in the flora and fauna of the region.

The roof section of the temple, restored in the mid-19th century.

In 1859, the people of the nearby village of Bogdanje complained about the Ljubostinja brotherhood to the Saint Andrew's Day Assembly, writing that "the monks fenced off their land, stole their forests, meadows, and vineyards", and then charged them for wood; that they "stole livestock from the pastures", and above all that "they bury the dead without a Requiem" and that "they do not consecrate the slava water as they should". They stated in the letter to the Assembly that "they did not suffer such hardships even under the Turks". Similar complaints had occurred before, but the Obrenovićs, great admirers of Ljubostinja, always remained deaf to them.

In a very short time, a large number of abbots succeeded each other in the monastery, only to be quickly sent elsewhere. In 1866, Abbot Janićije died, and two years later Makarije (Milojević) took over the brotherhood, whose portrait was kept in the church until the arrival of the Austrians. Sometime during this period, between 1866 and 1870, the academic painter Nikola Marković painted the iconostasis. After Makarije's death, Danilo (Marković) became abbot (1871-1875), who harbored a love for fruit growing and viticulture. His greatest legacy to Ljubostinja was precisely plum orchards and vineyards. One of the vineyards of this, according to the chroniclers - "mediocre spiritual father but experienced economist," even bore his name - Danilovac. Danilo died in the middle of the summer of 1875.

In 1870, the monastery belonged to the Jagodina district, Levač srez, and the Archdiocese of Belgrade. At that time, a total of four monks resided in the monastery, and the monastery slava was Velika Gospojina - the Dormition of the Mother of God, to whom the temple was dedicated. At one point, briefly, the slava also became the Transfiguration of Jesus, when a new folk assembly began to be organized around the church.

After Danilo, the administration of the monastery was taken over by Teofilo, then Vićentije, and already in 1878 Venijamin (Pavićević) became abbot. In August 1891, another murder occurred in the monastery, when Hieromonk Vićentije (Stamatović) was found dead. Since the cause of his death was not clarified, it was believed to be a murder out of envy among the monks. In 1895, the monastery estate amounted to 1078 hectares of land, of which 990 hectares were covered by forest. Besides arable land and meadows, there were three vineyards and seven orchards. The pure monastery capital exceeded 18,000 dinars, and the total value of Ljubostinja's real estate was estimated at 42,000 dinars. According to censuses conducted during those years, Ljubostinja usually ranked second, third, or fourth on the list of the richest monasteries in Serbia.

=== Age of turmoil ===
At the end of the 19th century and the beginning of the 20th century, a series of incidents occurred that had both beneficial and disastrous effects on the monastery's reputation and significance. First, in 1898, Archimandrite Venijamin was accused of embezzlement and abuse of office on official duty. He was replaced the same year, but was allowed to stay in the monastery, where he later died and was buried in 1909. He was succeeded by Viktor (Stojaković), whose reputation was already shaken by then. It is recorded that during his time, the monastery's financial situation began to decline. In 1903, he faced the same accusation as his predecessor - embezzlement and abuse of office.

Picture of Ljubostinja Monastery from 1910.

Viktor was dismissed two years later, then defrocked, and finally sentenced to prison, which he did not complete due to illness. From 1905 to 1911, the monastery was managed by Viktor (Gizdavić), who was not only unpopular among the people but came into such conflict with the parishioners that he himself requested and received a transfer.

In the midst of these scandals, on the orders of King Petar I Karađorđević, the famous Serbian antiquarian researcher, Mihailo Valtrović, came to the monastery in 1903, with a decision to open Milica's sarcophagus. Valtrović wanted to get a closer look at the crown jewels and royal insignia of medieval Serbia, to use them as a model for creating new ones for the king's upcoming coronation. To his surprise, when the sarcophagus was opened, he saw Milica in a modest black monastic robe. Moreover, her body was incorrupt, and her face still identical to the one painted on the frescoes. The Church used that moment to canonize the princess and restore the damaged reputation of the monastery. The feast day of Venerable Evgenija has since been celebrated on 1 August.

Ljubostinja Monastery, photograph from 1915

The manager of the monastery from 1911 to 1920 was Archimandrite Konstantin (Popović). During the Military General Governorate of Serbia, an Austrian division stormed the monastery on 24 October 1915, and accused Popović and Hieromonk Ruvim, but also the youngest among them, Hieromonk Sevastijan, of hiding a portion of the Serbian Government's archives in the monastery. Sevastijan (Putnik), an attendee of the Monastic School in Novo Hopovo, was taken to the Austrian camp Aschach, from where he returned after the war. During the three-year occupation, the monastery served as the seat of the Forestry Administration, but was essentially a camp. Captured Italians and Serbs were housed in the church, in the konaks, and in the attics, and were driven daily to clear the monastery forest. When beating the internees, the Austrians used a "stone bear", which a peasant from Donji Dubič had found ploughing in a field before the war. When the war was almost over, the Austrians plundered the monastery like no one before. Besides taking gold, silver, and brass objects, as well as all four bells, they also gathered spoons, plates, and used towels.

Staying at the monastery

The Holy Liturgy is celebrated on Saturdays, Sundays, and holidays from 8 am. Vespers begin at 5 pm. During colder winter days, the service is moved to the winter church, by the New Konak. Since the konaks are intended exclusively for the peaceful life of the nuns, it is not possible to stay overnight in the monastery today.

In 1919, the scientist and inventor Mihajlo Pupin visited Ljubostinja, and already the following year Father Sevastijan replaced Archimandrite Popović as the monastery administrator. Sevastijan Putnik was born as Stevan Perić, in the Banat village of Samoš. Significant for the reconstruction of the monastery's history today is his chronicle Manastir Ljubostinja, the proceeds from the sale of which, after publication in 1927, were entirely donated to orphans from the Ljubostinja area. The chronicle begins with a lyrical preface to Ljubostinja, in which Perić tells Princess Milica's endowment that it will be "eternal and beautiful, because love conceived it, love birthed it, love sustained it, so love will also be the pledge of its eternal and happy life".

He was succeeded twelve years later by Abbot-Syncellus Platon (Milojević) (1932-1934), but after only two years of management, Bishop Nikolaj sent him to the Veluće monastery in March 1934. He was also the last male abbot. By a decree of the Serbian Orthodox Church from 1937, Ljubostinja became a female monastery, so in the fall of 1939 - after 521 years - the administration of the monastery was taken over by an abbess - Mother Sara (Đuketić). The most valuable material treasure of the monastery that Đuketić found after a history of destruction and looting was the library in Miloš's konak, which at that time numbered over a thousand titles. Among others, there was a special edition of the religious study The Imitation of Christ (De Imitatione Christi, 1417), by the Dutch theologian Thomas à Kempis. It was printed in 1637, at the behest of the Wallachian countess Elena Năsturel.

=== Suffering of the nuns ===
Sara became the abbess of Ljubostinja during the difficult times of World War II, but she received great help from the then Ljubostinja spiritual father, Nikon (Lazarević). Although he was officially a Ljubostinja priest between 1946 and 1961, he also helped this monastery before, while he was the abbot of Kalenić. His greatest contribution today is considered to be the construction of the New Konak, at that time the most beautiful in Yugoslavia. The architect of the new konak was Petar Bajalović, whose most famous buildings were the Ilija M. Kolarac Endowment and the building of the University of Belgrade Faculty of Law.

The new konak of the monastery.

At the beginning of the war, a shelter for boys was opened in Trstenik, and in Ljubostinja for 12 girls who had no home. At that time, monk Jakov (Arsović), better known as Jakov Tumanski, came to the monastery and stayed in it for several years. During the first years of her care for Ljubostinja, Mother Sara enjoyed the great support and favor of Bishop Nikolaj Velimirović, who spent eighteen months in Ljubostinja (from the Feast of Saints Peter and Paul 1941, to 5 December 1942) under house arrest. He left Mother Sara a notebook in the form of a spiritual manual, with advice for the sisterhood. Here he also wrote some of his greatest works, including the poem The Building of Ljubostinja. Together with Velimirović, Vasilije Kostić, Bishop of Žiča and Banja Luka, and Bishop Nikolaj's nephew - Jovan Velimirović, Bishop of Šabac-Valjevo, were also exiled here. Sixty years later, Jewess Ela Trifunović Neuhaus defended the bishop against later accusations of antisemitism, revealing that Velimirović saved her mother and her from certain death during the war - stuffing her into a sack, and dressing her mother in monastic robes, and then sheltering them in Ljubostinja.

After Nikolaj's departure, and after the burning of Žiča, refugees and dozens of Žiča monks arrived in Ljubostinja. One of them, Hieromonk Sava Maksimović, was soon killed by the Germans. Another Žiča monk was arrested and killed in Kruševac. Abbess Sara was accused of participating in both arrests and murders. Furthermore, the Chetniks accused her of participating in the murder of Jovan Gordić, the son of Chetnik commander Nikola Gordić. The abbess, on the other hand, was also accused of hiding a Chetnik radio station, which the English allegedly gifted to Nikolaj Velimirović. Although the nuns said that the doors of the monastery were open to everyone, and that they in no way chose sides in the war, they were subjected to abuse by the Chetniks, the Partisans, and the Germans.

At the same time, a conflict arose between Abbess Sara and Protopresbyter Sava Petrović, an authoritative judge of the Žiča Church Court, and a Ljubostinja guest at the time, who immoderately and rigorously punished the nuns, and that conflict even led to an internal split in the sisterhood. According to the account of the subsequent abbess, there was an assumption that one of the feuding parties asked for help from one of the military forces at the time, most likely the Chetniks. A popular urban legend was also recorded, according to which it was a love affair of one of the nuns that enraged the sisters, so they reported her to the Ljotićevci and the Gestapo, thus bringing even greater ruin upon the community.

Vespers in the monastery in 2021.

Monastery picture from the other side 2025.

At the beginning of 1943, a note was dropped through the window of the monastery office with a message to the abbess to flee with the sisters, "otherwise they will all be slaughtered." However, the sisters also received contradictory and disturbing messages not to go anywhere, or not to even think of fleeing, because only in that case would they be slaughtered. It wasn't even the end of January, and two attempts to assassinate Abbess Sara had already been recorded. In one of those two cases, when Chetniks burst into the church, the sisters hid the abbess under the holy table (altar).

On an icy Epiphany morning, in the pitch dark, one of the workers in the monastery harnessed a sleigh in which he hid the abbess, and threw hay and straw over her, then drove her through the snow to Trstenik, from where she fled to Belgrade. The Chetniks then announced that they were looking for her biological sisters, Evgenija and Antonija - also Ljubostinja nuns, as well as novice Milka, Sara's confidante and housekeeper. On the evening after Saint Sava's Day, they burst into the chapel and took both Antonija and Evgenija from vespers. The first was slaughtered in the snow, and the second was severely wounded, not knowing she had survived. Although wounded, Evgenija managed to drag herself to the monastery, from where the nuns transferred her to the hospital, where she soon died. Novice Milka lived in great mental turmoil and constantly sought a hiding place. On the night they took Sara's two sisters, she hid under a bed in the konak. The Chetniks eventually got to her too. Before throwing her into the Morava, they first raped and slaughtered her. Nun Antonija, the so-called Ljubostinja martyr, was buried in the monastery courtyard, and Evgenija initially in Kruševac. After a few days, the river washed up Milka's body, but out of fear of Chetnik revenge, no one dared to bury it, so the peasants just returned it back into the Morava.

=== Center of female monasticism ===
Sara's position in 1943 was taken by her fellow sufferer from the war days, Mother Varvara (Milenović), first as a superior, and then as an abbess - from 1949 - and she remained the longest-serving abbess of Ljubostinja, until her death in 1995. For more than half a century of leadership, Mother Varvara, then the most famous nun in the country, managed to restore the monastery in every way. Known as a good organizer and as someone who insists on discipline, she established carpet-making and wickerwork workshops in the monastery, and even secured the export of products abroad. Above all, she strove to make it the largest center of female monasticism in Yugoslavia, gathering over 50 sisters in Ljubostinja. Justin Popović and former Abbess Sara visited the Ljubostinja sisters in 1952 or 1953, bringing the relics of her sister Evgenija and laying them in a grave in Ljubostinja, next to the relics of their sister Antonija. In 1979, Ljubostinja became a Monument of Culture of Exceptional Importance, with the highest degree of protection of the Republic of Serbia. Damjan Lisinac (whom the sisters called Prota Dača) became the parish priest in 1982 and stayed there until his retirement.

Ljubostinja nuns today produce honey and wine.

In 1995, Mother Hristina (Obradović) took over the leadership, having been the housekeeper for Abbess Varvara. Hristina was one of the most recognizable faces of the Serbian Orthodox Church even in her youth, as she was the first nun to drive a car (a "Lada"), and was even pulled over once for speeding. That event was covered by newspaper headlines in Yugoslavia, which called her the flying nun. During Mother Hristina's leadership, Ljubostinja became more present in the media. In 2002, an album of Byzantine music was released, titled Agios o Theos: Ancient Orthodox Chants from Serbia, for which the Ljubostinja sisters (named Nuns of Ljubostinja on the album) sang five songs: Ninje otpuščajeski, Cherubic Hymn, Hymn of Ljubostinja, Song to Princess Milica, and Svjete tihi. The recordings themselves actually date back to 1963. The grave of Princess Milica was visited in 2016 by Prince Aleksandar and Princess Katarina Karađorđević, and in 2019 by writer and Nobel Prize in Literature laureate Peter Handke.

Because of its great wealth, the monastery also suffered great damage after World War II. With the enactment of the law on agrarian reform (1945) and on Nationalization (1958), more than 1400 hectares of forest and arable land were taken from Ljubostinja. Under the restitution law, property was returned to the monastery on two occasions - in 2009 and 2016. The total area of the Ljubostinja estate today is 1321.44 hectares, of which 1298.90 hectares (or 98.3% of the territory) are under forest.

The current parish priest of the monastery, a former student of the Saints Cyril and Methodius Serbian Orthodox Seminary during the Kosovo War - Father Danijel (Stefanović), has spoken about Ljubostinja for Hram and Agro TV televisions. The monastery is located on the wine route and in the enotourism region of Aleksandrovačka Župa, and is known for its monastery wine. In addition, the nuns cultivate the tradition of Beekeeping and the production of honey.

== Architecture ==
=== Venetian-Islamic sculpture ===
The main contractor on the church was Rade Neimar (Rade Borović), who carved his name on the threshold of the door leading from the narthex into the naos. Working on Ljubostinja together with about 500 workers, he aimed to emphasize the rhythm of forms that are visibly repeated, thereby creating an impression of harmony and connection. The construction of Ljubostinja brought Rade great fame, and his name was even sung about in epic poems. This is also one of the rare instances where the name of the protomaster of a Serbian sanctuary is reliably known. Particularly interesting is the secret room he built at the princess's request - a room that was once concealed by a large icon, and in which she later kept her valuables. Borović managed to orient the Ljubostinja temple astronomically precisely towards the equinox east, so that every 20 March the rising Sun is in perfect parallel with the easternmost point of the Ljubostinja naos.

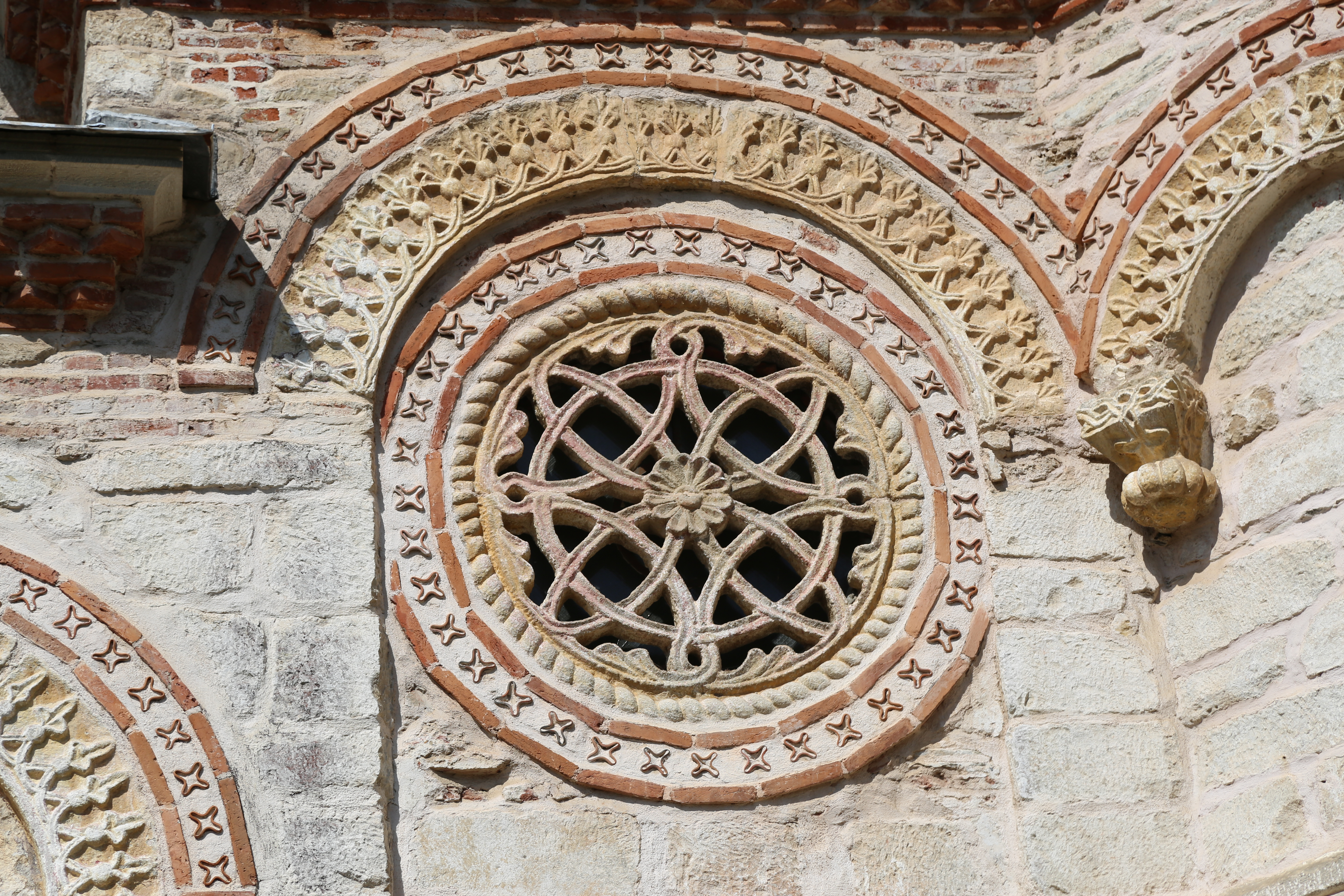
The church is recognizable by its ornate rose windows.

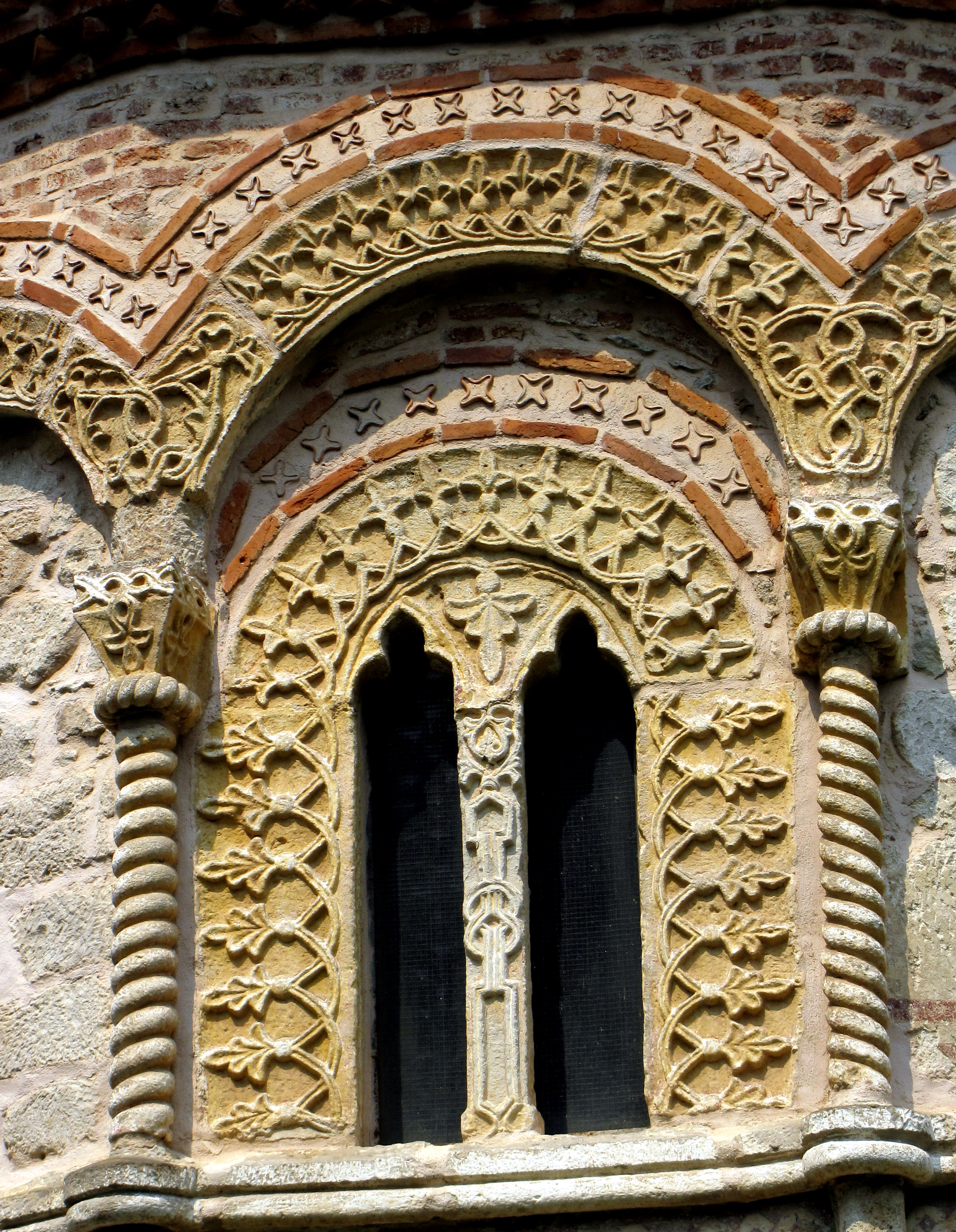
The bifora with a Saracen arch unified influences from several climes.

The monastery church has a triconch (trefoil) foundation of an advanced type, with a rectangular narthex that connects to the naos, and a Dome supported by four pillars. It is 24 meters high, 20 meters long, and 6 meters wide. It was constructed following the model of Hilandar and similar types of inscribed cross churches. Unlike other buildings of the Morava style, Ljubostinja deviates from their elongation, so it has a somewhat compact plan (similar to monasteries of the Serbo-Byzantine school).

It was built in the (late) Morava style (like Veluće, Rudenica, and Kalenić), but more modestly and simpler than all the monasteries of that direction. While others were built by regular layering of stone and brick, Ljubostinja was built with dressed sandstone, of various origins and shapes. However, the rough masonry was ultimately covered with painted facades that imitate masonry with stone and brick, and the temple is enriched with stone ornamentation, namely lilies in the lower zone, and rose windows in the upper zone. Horizontally, three, and sometimes four rows of bricks are painted, while beneath the cordon cornice around the entire church, a band of intertwined ribbons is painted.

There are a total of 13 rose windows on the church - 7 large and six small. They mostly share common characteristics: they are all surrounded by a ring of rope, all (except the three small ones) have a flower in the center, and all the large rose windows are also surrounded by a ring with ceramic crosses. The largest are the three rose windows on the narthex, of which the rose window on the south side, with five-petaled lilies, is distinctly Gothic. This method of building was not known in earlier Serbian architecture. It can be taken that the recognizable motifs of the Ljubostinja decoration are precisely the imitation of rich decorative masonry, rose windows and lily, and checkerboard fields on smaller and secondary surfaces. The aesthetics of lush stone interweaves in portals and windows matured in medieval miniatures, i.e., in the drawn architecture of illustrated psalters and other church books, but also in the studded silver decoration on icon frames.

The present appearance of the monastery speaks of the influence of sculpture and painted decoration on architecture, but in a way that harmony and proportion surprisingly emerge precisely from the lavishly and lushly decorated attire of the composition. A counterpart to the Moorish ornament, the facade painted with floral and geometric motifs is brought to the pinnacle of expressive possibilities in Ljubostinja. Rare in Serbian architecture are window endings with two openings (biforas), but with a trefoil arch, modeled after Venetian (Venice) and Dubrovnik Gothic. Incorporating and reworking Saracen and arabesque floral motifs of Islamic art, Venetian Gothic gave the building characteristics of the oriental Byzantium.

Đurić points out that cordon cornices, rose windows, checkerboard fields, pilasters, blind arcades, and colonnettes are "playful" in other monasteries of that era, while in Ljubostinja they form a single organism with the carved decoration, "they are nobler and more harmonious". He also asserts that in Serbian medieval art there is no other place where the symbiosis of architecture and sculpture has been realized to such an extent. The French Byzantinologist Gabriel Millet said of the Ljubostinja temple that with it, the Morava school was brought to perfection. Ljubostinja decorations inspired the 2018 jubilee 10th edition of the Serbia Fashion Week, named Empress Milica.

=== Heavenly vegetation ===
The founder's sarcophagus, in which Jefimija was nevertheless buried, and not Princess Milica, is covered with carved lilies (lilies). The cross, which was almost obligatory on sarcophagi, is not carved here. According to Protopresbyter Danijel, the Ljubostinja parish priest, the symbolism of the lily, which until Baroque art denotes "good news, a hint of happiness, and even chastity," here gains a more local and intimate meaning, which is in direct connection with the cult of the martyred Prince Lazar, and the verses from his Akathist and Praise to Prince Lazar, in which the prince is called a "fragrant lily" and a "lily that grew from thorns and shines upon all". The Ljubostinja lily is a symbol of resurrection, the heavenly kingdom, and eternal life.

Single and double wreaths of lilies in Ljubostinja cover rose windows, windows, blind niches, and connect lesenes and applied colonnettes. Historian Ljiljana Vinulović provided a comprehensive study on the significance and symbolism of the lily in the Ljubostinja church. According to her words, the stone plastics that insist on lilies are not mere sacral decoration, but are there to remind of the anticipation of the heavenly church among people, the Garden of Eden on earth, in which the lily grows as a heavenly flower. The symbolism of the lily is also tied to the Old Testament King Solomon, since lilies stood at the top of the pillars at the entrance to his temple, but also to the image of Archangel Gabriel, who gives a lily to the Virgin Mary and tells her that she will give birth to Christ. In both cases, the lily is a herald of wisdom (logos) - whether it is the one the people went to Solomon's Temple for, or the arrival of divine wisdom through Jesus.

In a narrower sense, blooming lilies and other floral interweaves illustrate heavenly vegetation, which is why Ljubostinja is supposed to be the embodiment of a kind of paradise on earth. It is the only monastery in Serbia without animal and human stone decorations.

== Painting ==
=== Coldness of Roman palaces ===
According to some interpretations, the oldest, original fresco painting was done immediately before the Battle of Kosovo and only fragments of it are preserved in the pendentives, the lower zone of the drum, and on a few other surfaces. Already in 1403, Princess Milica invited the Greek painter Makarije Zograf to repaint the church. It is known that the painter answered the call, and one of the inscriptions next to Milica's portrait testified that the church was fully painted on 14 August 1403, the day before the patron saint's day. Some studies have shown that the oldest frescoes currently found in Ljubostinja were painted only after Milica's death (between 1405 and 1409). Today, Makarije's signature can be seen on the arch above the door leading from the narthex to the naos.

Art historian Srđan Đurić writes that the oldest Ljubostinja frescoes are characterized by an extremely cold color palette, especially through pale shades of cinnabar red and malachite green, and a cold harmony of gray and blue, because of which the church walls resemble the walls of old palaces in Roman provinces. The recognizable and authentic medieval combination of Byzantine blue and gold is not present in Ljubostinja, at least not to the extent and intensity as in other Serbian monasteries. Makarije never fully defines the space in which the scenes take place. According to Đurić, he is not skilled at painting large compositions, but is exceptional as a painter of vivid faces. The historian based on this believes that the zograf was first an icon painter, and only then a fresco painter. His saints are not necessarily beautiful, and he does not emphasize sensuality as is the case in Kalenić and Manasija. They are strict and restrained, with furrowed brows, eyes of ascetics. Makarije only tried to breathe more individualism into the royal portraits.

Iconostasis by Nikola Marković from 1866.

Fresco of Archangel Michael.

Iconostasis up close

In the narthex, there is the founder's portrait of Princess Milica and a portrait of Prince Lazar, as well as portraits of their sons Vuk and Stefan. Vuk Lazarević is painted in blue garments, holding a cross, but is the only one without symbols of power and is not signed. Stefan is in red garments, but holds a scepter in the shape of a cross, while the inscription next to it says: "In Christ God, the pious and most high and God-holding Stefan despot, lord of all Serbian and Danubian lands", which indicates that the fresco was created after he received the title of despot, i.e., after 1402. Two angels lower a crown onto his head and hand him a sword. Princess Milica wears a red sakkos with a dark red ornament of connected rhombuses, bearing floral motifs in the shape of lilies, with pearls and jewels. She is draped in a green cloak with blue lining, edged with a gold ribbon. On her head, she wears a white veil, with fine dark embroidery, earrings with jewels and pearls, and an open crown that widens towards the top. In her book Women Founders and Visual Culture of the Balkans, historian Ljubica Vinulović writes that Princess Milica, like her predecessors, Jelena Anjou and Jelena Nemanjić, built her royal identity through fresco painting. This is mostly seen in the painted Ecumenical Councils in the narthex of the temple, whereby Serbian medieval rulers sent a message that, like their husbands, they too have political power, even "so much to convene a state council", while through the image of Milica, Christ's divine power is manifested, which points to the God-given and holy lineage of the Nemanjić and Lazarević dynasties. The painted program of the naos corresponds to the spiritual and funerary, and the narthex - to the political, i.e., sovereign function of the monastery.

From the painted works, the frescoes of the Prophets are preserved: Micah, Gideon, David, Ezekiel, Zechariah, Zephaniah, Jeremiah, and Hosius. All are painted astonished and excited by the manifestation of God (probably Christ Pantocrator). The frescoes in the pendentives can only be faintly seen. In the southwestern part, the evangelist Mark is discernible, with the personification of Wisdom in the form of a girl. In the northeastern pendentive, the personification of Wisdom is painted as a magnificent ancient palace. In the southeastern pendentive, there once were frescoes of the evangelist John and his disciple Prochorus.

Essentially, the arrangement of the scenes followed the tradition of the Morava school, so the Great Holidays were on the vaults of the naos, the Passions in the upper zone of the walls, and Miracles and Sermons in the central part. From the Great Holidays, hints of Palm Sunday and Dormition of the Virgin can be seen, while the scene of the Annunciation is almost entirely preserved. From the scenes of the Passions, Mocking of Christ, Peter's Denial, Descent from the Cross, and Entombment are discernible. The painted Miracles belong to the best-preserved compositions. These are: in the southern part, above the choir, the fourth and fifth weeks after Pascha, i.e., the compositions Healing of the Paralytic from the Bed and Jesus and the Samaritan Woman. In the northern choir are the frescoes Healing of the Man Born Blind, from the sixth week, and Anointing in Bethany. Great monks and ascetics, figures of saints, Christian poets, holy warriors, and others are also painted: Archangel Michael, Archangel Gabriel, on the southwestern pillar of the naos - Saint Sava and Stefan Nemanja, Saint Theodore the Studite, John of Damascus, Saint Judah, Saint Theodosius, Saint Ephrem the Syrian, and Saint Sava of Jerusalem (St. Sabbas the Sanctified). All frescoes are in poor condition. The depiction of Emperor Constantine the Great and Empress Helena is discernible by the inscription.

Smiljka Gabelić in her research highlights the significance of the rare fresco of the Persian saint, Saint Govdelas, painted in a group of warriors in the northern choir. His head is not preserved. The fresco is even more interesting because Saint Govdelas is always painted alongside Saint Dadas, since the Orthodox world celebrates them together on 12 October, while in Ljubostinja he stands independently.

In the period from 1866 to 1870, a new iconostasis was painted in the style of Romanticism and national revival. Today of great value, this artwork was created by academic painter Nikola Marković from Belgrade, son of Milija Marković, and student of Steva Todorović.

Bishop Nikolaj admired the way in which architecture, painting, and nature coalesce in Ljubostinja in the service of theology and liturgy, and in his poem The Building of Ljubostinja he called the monastery a "rest for the soul", and said that Ljubostinja is "sung to God, the most beautiful song on Serbian land".

=== Healing the paralytic at Bethesda ===
Đurić emphasizes that the most valuable fresco of the Ljubostinja monastery is actually the Second Council of Constantinople, on which priests, soldiers, and the suggestive and awe-inspiring Emperor Justinian I are painted. Art historian Tamara Ognjević claims that Healing the paralytic at Bethesda is in fact the most prominent scene, and a true masterpiece of Serbian fresco painting.

Remains of the fresco above the southern choir.

Đurić highlights the fidelity with which Healing the Paralytic conveys all the details of the story from the Gospel. It features Christ, with the apostles standing behind him, and then the sick man, on the left side, who symbolically carries a bed on his back. A cross-shaped fountain is also painted, with a five-part portico in front of the temple, which is a novelty compared to the Christian story. The image of the ancient sage Socrates, who is also incorporated into the composition as a silent observer of the miraculous healing, according to Đurić, is exceptional and mystical, especially if one considers the medieval tradition of comparing Christ (the teacher) with ancient philosophers - primarily with (teacher) Socrates, whose death is viewed as the hagiography of a saint-martyr. Đurić also points out that the scene has a series of levels on which it should be understood gradually: first - with the presence of the philosopher - as intellectualized, which then rationalized depicts the manifestation of divine power in the form of healing, and it is precisely that healing that brings it to life as a multidimensional whole - the sick man still carries the bed on his back, but having just been healed, he stands in an unnatural posture, his head abruptly turned towards Christ, but due to disbelief, surprise, and confusion, he is still afraid to take the first step.

== Theories on ktetorship ==
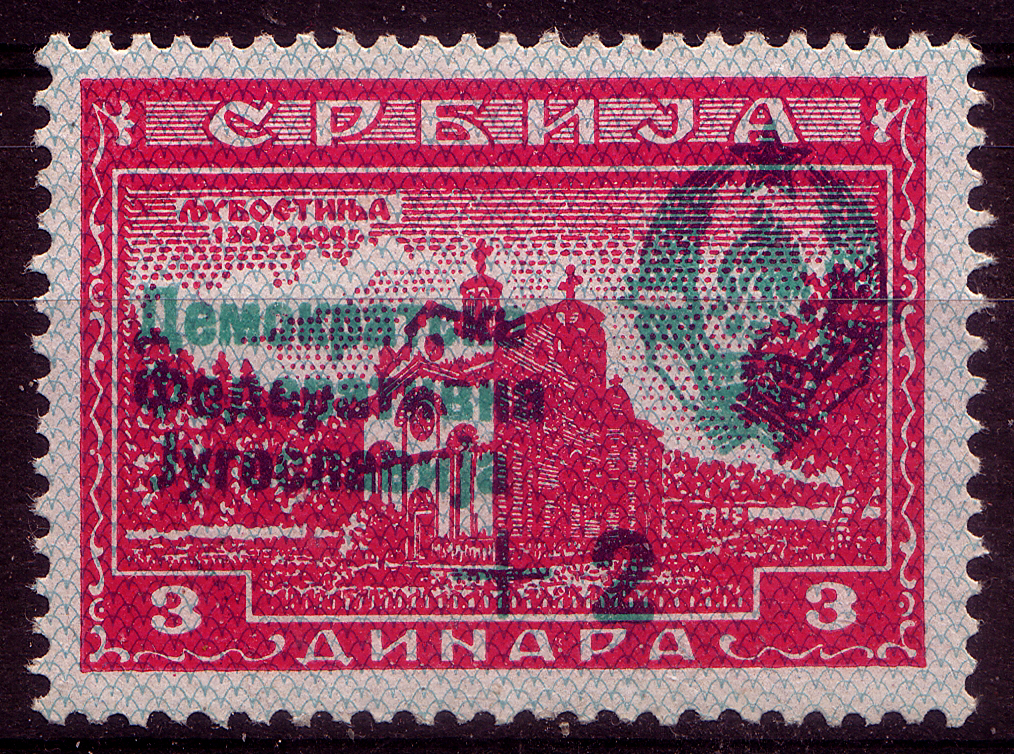
Yugoslav postage stamp from 1945.

Interpretations by some historians refute the theory that Princess Milica was the ktetor (founder) of the monastery. Namely, Constantine of Kostenets records in 1433-1439 that Milica was "laid to rest in her monastery, called Ljubostinja", and historians begin to interpret that sentence in six different ways:

1. She is the ktetor of the monastery she designated for her burial church, and that is why she is buried there
2. Ljubostinja is Milica's monastery, where she resides as a nun, where she dies and is buried within it
3. It is her monastery, as are all the others, since she was the ruler
4. It is her monastery, but she did not build it, rather she acquired subsequent rights to it, by concession or takeover
5. It is the monastery she designated for burial by her last wish
6. It is her monastery because she will rest there eternally

Historian Branislav Todić believes that Ljubostinja was created much earlier, during the time of King Stefan Milutin, "because it would be unusual for the wife of a living ruler to build an endowment", especially considering that "Prince Lazar chose Ravanica for their eternal resting place". This idea is partly supported by the folk tradition according to which Milica was not even buried in Ljubostinja at all, but at "her favorite place", on the Prozraka hill, in the Đurovača church (today in ruins). The ktetorship of King Milutin is supported by some authors by the fact that Ljubostinja was not built like other monasteries of the Morava architectural school, but because of the dressed stone it more closely resembles his endowments Gračanica, Hilandar, and Banjska Monastery.

In support of the theory that Ljubostinja existed as early as 1381 came findings of an older layer of frescoes in the upper parts of the naos and narthex, beneath the one created around 1402, when the monastery was officially painted. Vinulović considers that this is not valid proof that Milica is not the founder, since it was not unusual for Serbian monasteries to have their frescoes done on multiple occasions (like Sopoćani and Visoki Dečani), especially if works had to be halted for some reason (here: the Battle of Kosovo).

On the other hand, theorists question the fact that after the Battle of Maritsa (1371) Despotess Jelena (Nun Jefimija) came to Kruševac, to the court of the Hrebeljanovićs. They believe she became a nun earlier in Serres, right after the battle where she lost her husband, and that during the eighties of the 14th century she had been living in Ljubostinja, which was assigned to her for monastic life, and that Milica only joined her later. In support of this theory, they cite that Jefimija was buried precisely in the founder's sarcophagus, and question the probability that a ruler-founder (in this case: Milica) would allow someone else to be buried in their tomb. However, these claims contradict the writings of Milica and Jefimija's contemporary, Constantine of Kostenets, who wrote about the significance Jefimija had at Lazar's court in Kruševac, and about her stimulating influence on the upbringing of the princely couple's children, primarily Jelena Balšić.

Until the discovery of the fact that Jefimija outlived Milica, it was believed that Milica gave up her grave to her best friend, who died before her. However, with the discovery that Milica lived until 1405, and Jefimija until 1406 or early 1407, the question was raised again why Jefimija did not place Milica in the founder's sarcophagus. Art historian Danica Popović disputes the fact that it was even carved at that time, but says it was created only later, from parts of the ruined narthex. Perić writes that, when considering the identity of the decoration and material on the naos and the narthex, it is more than obvious that the narthex was not added subsequently. According to Srđan Đurić, the body of Princess Milica was moved from the tomb in the southwestern part of the naos to the northeastern part of the narthex in the 18th century, below the founder's fresco.

A large number of authors emphasize that scientific research must not ignore the religious moment, and the fact that both noblewomen took monastic vows, and then an even stricter one, the vow of the Great Schema, and that, devoted to the patterns of rigorous monastic life in their ascetic old age, they did not burden themselves with material wealth and royal insignia, nor with what kind of tomb they would be buried in. When Milica's sarcophagus was opened at the beginning of the 20th century, researchers saw that instead of a monarch and with crown jewels, the princess was buried as a nun, in a black monastic robe. However, historians agree that from a state-legal and dynastic point of view, it still remains unclear why and whether Princess Milica decided not to be buried next to Prince Lazar, as well as the question in which of the three monastery sarcophagi the relics of Saint Petka were kept between (circa) 1400 and 1407.

== Mausoleum and ossuary ==
Austro-Hungarian travel writer and archaeologist Felix Kanitz visited Ljubostinja in 1888, and noticed that the sarcophagus along the south wall had been opened and that "three skeletons of some members of the Nemanjić dynasty" were found in it. Due to the existence of the secret room, and numerous legends related to it, frequent attempts by treasure hunters to secretly dig up the courtyard, and even the interior of the temple, were known. When the Ministry of Education took charge of antiquities, Mihailo Valtrović used the opportunity to begin the first professional excavations and research around Princess Milica's endowment in 1904. His research on Ljubostinja was the very beginning of the history of archaeological investigations of the Middle Ages and royal burials on the territory of Serbia.

The ossuary in the southwestern part of the courtyard houses the relics of unknown Kosovo heroes, brought to Ljubostinja by their widows, as well as the relics of subsequent monastery inhabitants.

The data he obtained were published in the journal Starinar in 1906. Valtrović discovered two tombs in the Ljubostinja naos, one of which was as long as 2.58, 1.17 wide, and 1.67 meters deep. Đurić writes that this was exactly the grave of Princess Milica, because the customs of the time dictated that royal tombs be built in the naos, and that her body was moved to a new sarcophagus at the end of the 18th century.

Abbot Sevastijan Putnik also left records about the graves in his booklet from 1927. Among other things, he says that the people once believed that the body of Despot Stefan Lazarević was laid in the founder's sarcophagus, but that cannot be true because "when the tomb was opened, there were no bones in it" (without explaining who opened the tomb and when). Putnik also speaks about a small chest that was located on this sarcophagus, which kept parts of the ribs of Serbian Patriarchs Danilo and Nikodim, and Saint Prohor of Pčinja.

In 1966, the most extensive and professional research was conducted, when trenches were placed along the northern side of the narthex, reaching the depth of the foundation trench (0.9-1.2 meters). The trenches revealed several parallel graves, and a total of ten skeletons excavated by archaeologist Mirjana Ljubinković. All the deceased had their hands crossed on their chests, and only one was turned upside down - with the head in the east, and legs in the west. One of the skeletons also had seven whitish pearls beneath the crossed arms. In the southern part of the narthex, opposite Princess Milica's grave, Ljubinković discovered another grave, beneath the floor subbase, which contained a few teeth and a few skin fragments, gathered in a pile. The research did not lead to any discoveries that would confirm the legend about the existence of the original church, dedicated to Saint Stephen, upon whose foundations Ljubostinja was supposedly built.

The 1966 research eventually led to the discovery of 32 graves inside and around the church, testifying to the significance the temple holds as a kind of memorial ossuary for the monastic community and the decimated Serbian nobility. Based on the excavations, archaeologists established that in Ljubostinja, the cult of the founder and other famous figures was nevertheless tied to the narthex, not the naos. A large number of the found remains are today laid in the ossuary, located in the southeastern part of the courtyard. Folk tradition greatly sympathized with Princess Milica in her widowhood, and left various vivid, elegiac, oral, and written images of the transfer of the relics of Kosovo heroes to the Ljubostinja courtyard, Kruševac, and the Ravanica monastery, which can differ in certain details. The folk epic poem The Fall of the Serbian Empire recounts that Milica went to Kosovo with a retinue consisting of the patriarch, twelve bishops, priests, monks, deacons, and the widows of Kosovo heroes, and together they collected what remained of the fallen warriors. There she found the bodies of Milan Toplica, Ivan Kosančić, and Miloš Obilić, then the head of her brother, floating in the water, and finally the head of Prince Lazar. None of the several celebrated military commanders were buried in Ljubostinja. The cultural foundations of Ljubostinja were built upon the epic post-Kosovo archetype of widows in Kosovo, which was exploited for centuries, and is also addressed by the ballad The Death of the Mother of the Jugovići, where the widow of Jug-Bogdan from a historical point of view should be the mother of Princess Milica - but she is not, i.e., the ballad treats her as a non-historical figure.

Abbots Arsenije Ljubostinjski, Arsenije Stefanović, Janićije, Danilo, Venijamin, Sevastijan, Varvara, spiritual fathers Nikon and Damjan, sisters Evgenija and Antonija, and many others who marked the history of the monastery, were buried in the monastery cemetery.

== Archaeological sites ==
Although they are not formally united into a comprehensive archaeological group, in a narrow circle around Ljubostinja there is a ring of sites that are connected to the late antique or early Christian period in southern Šumadija and in the basin of the Great Morava.

On the Tatarna hill, west of the monastery, are the remains of the medieval town of Grabovac, known simply as Jerina's Town. Built in the 6th century, during the time of Emperor Justinian I, and restored during the Nemanjić era. Relatively close to the monastery are the archaeological sites Županjevački grad, a former large medieval court complex, as well as the Gradište site (often called Gradac) in Donji Dubič, most likely from the time of Emperor Justinian. In the vicinity of the monastery are two more sites bearing the name Gradac - in Brezovica and in Riđevštica. Between the villages of Počekovina and Donji Ribnik, yet close to the monastery, is the late antique site Grabak.

On the Kamađore hill, northeast of the temple, there are the remains of a church that the people call Trebnica. According to tradition, Princess Milica built this structure (now in ruins) to house a priest there, to come to Ljubostinja as needed to serve liturgy and confess the nuns - to be a spiritual father as needed. Hence the name of the church - Trebnica. On the Veternik hill, also above Ljubostinja, there is another church, which the people call Crkvina. On Bogdanovo Brdo there is the chapel of Jug-Bogdan (Crkvica, Sv. Petka), which this lord of Toplica supposedly visited when he toured his vineyards. Perić records that during World War I, near the bridge that leads from Trstenik across the West Morava to Ljubostinja, some ruins protruded from the river, which the people dismantled even more to collect building materials. The people attribute its origin to Jug-Bogdan as well. During the extraction of stone, a fully preserved human skeleton was discovered at that location, whose jaws were forged into the foundation of the wall with an iron clamp. According to legend, it was a man who spoke ill of the nobleman, and was therefore punished by retribution structured similarly to his transgression.

In the monastery courtyard, there is a medieval well, whose origin is not remembered. The people from the surrounding areas call it the Well of Empress Milica. Archaeological excavations have established that life - not only in the surroundings, but on the Ljubostinja estate itself, has existed continuously since antiquity. Excavations in the monastery church revealed denarii from the time of the Roman Republic, from 82 BC.

== Jefimija's Days ==
Since 1971, the event Jefimija's Days has been held in Trstenik and in the courtyard of the Ljubostinja monastery, which lasts for three days and is dedicated to Serbian poetry, primarily from a "female pen". At the first event, which lasted from 19 to 22 June 1971, in the monastery courtyard, verses were recited by the three greatest Yugoslav female poets - Desanka Maksimović, Mira Alečković, and Vesna Parun. The following year, the name of the celebration was changed to Days of Female Poets and Embroiderers, and in 1973, for political reasons, the event was abolished. It was renewed in 1991, retaining as its ideological core the creativity of women - painting, embroidery, poetry, and others. As part of the festival, a special musical-poetic evening is also held - In Honor of Jefimija, when, as a rule, a Serbian actress recites the Praise to Prince Lazar. Also, within the event, the Jefimija's Embroidery award is given - for the best poetic achievement.

Another award is associated with Ljubostinja, although it is not presented there. It is the Ljubostinja Rosette, which is the highest recognition of the city of Trstenik.

== Gallery ==
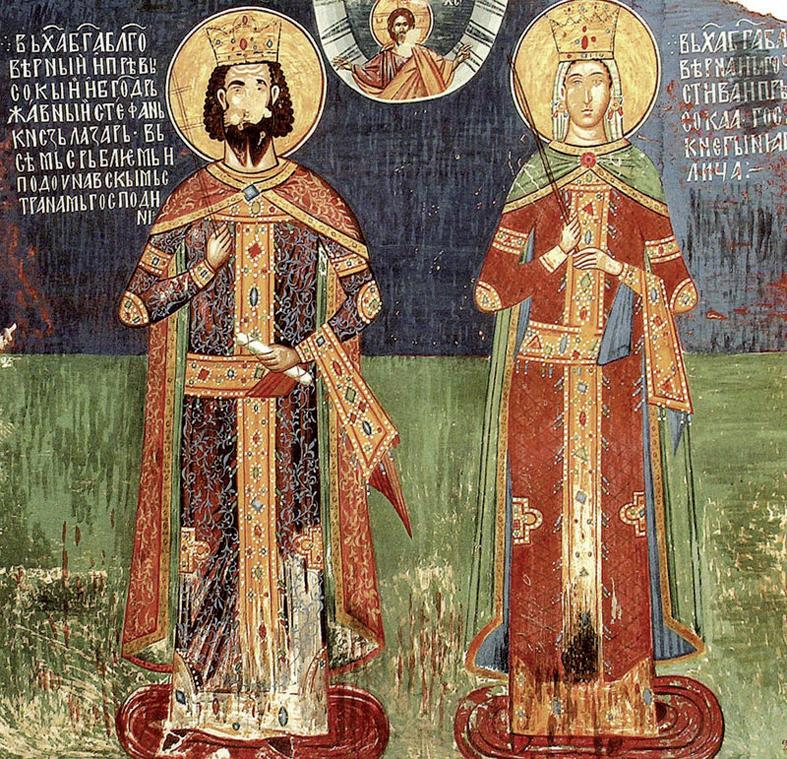
Prince Lazar and Princess Milica

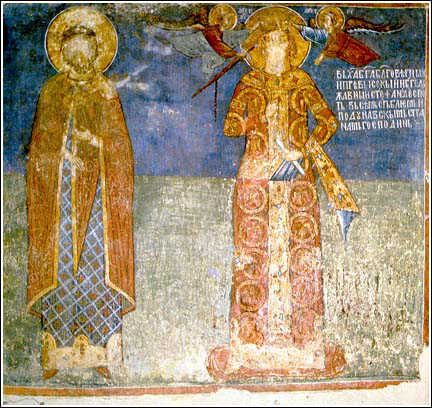
Vuk and Stefan Lazarević

Iconostasis

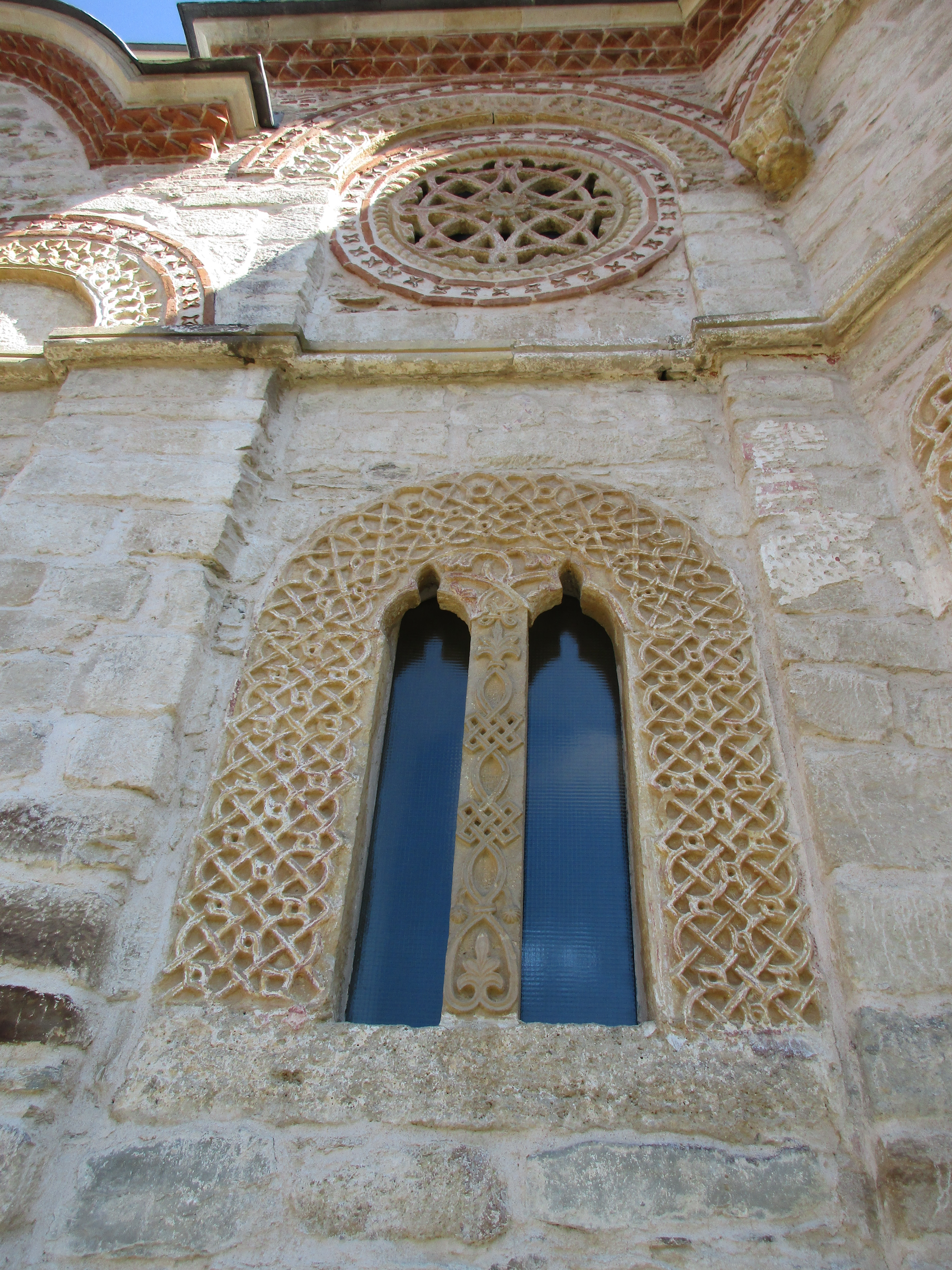
Bifora

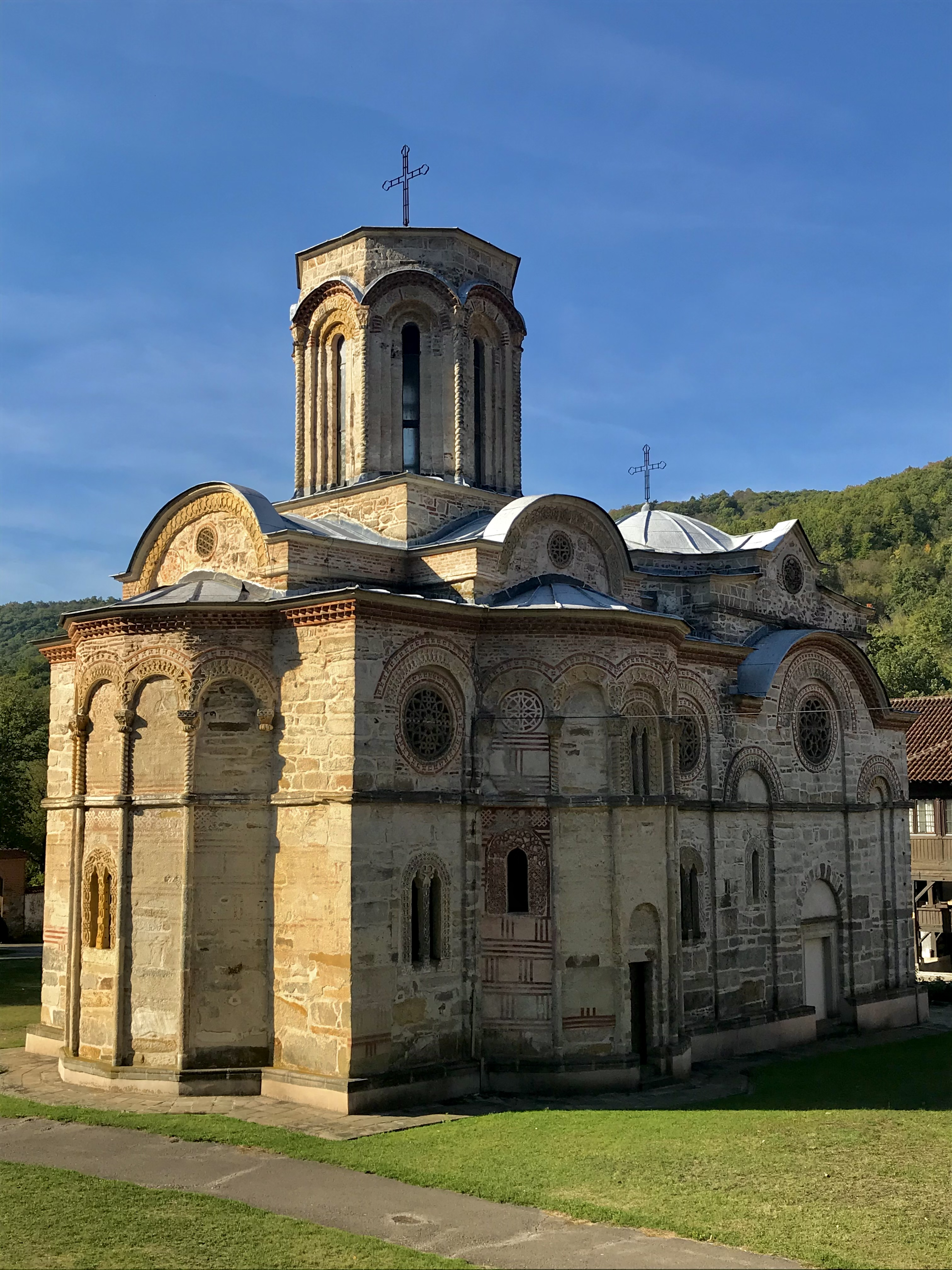
Eastern side of the church

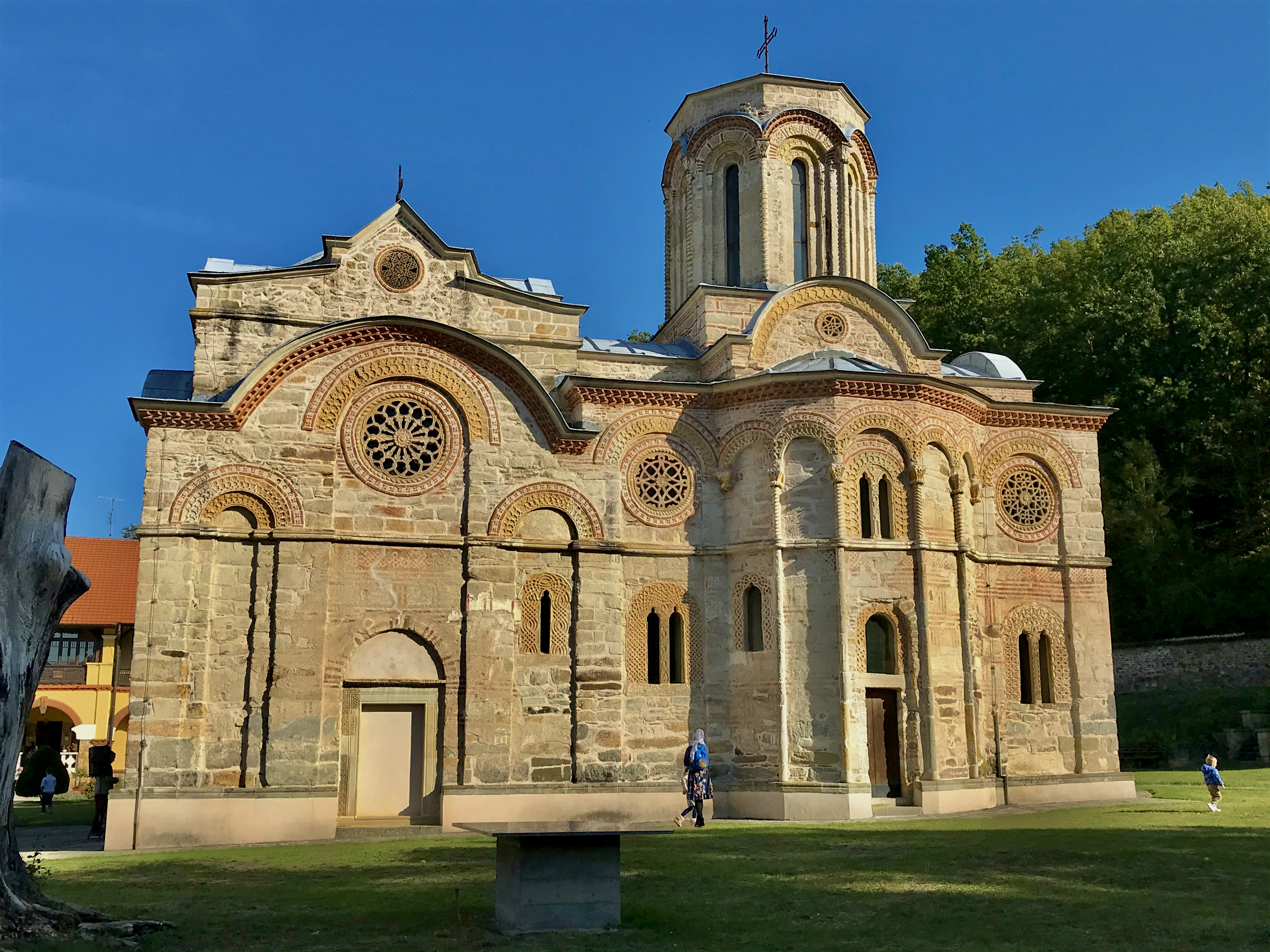
Western side

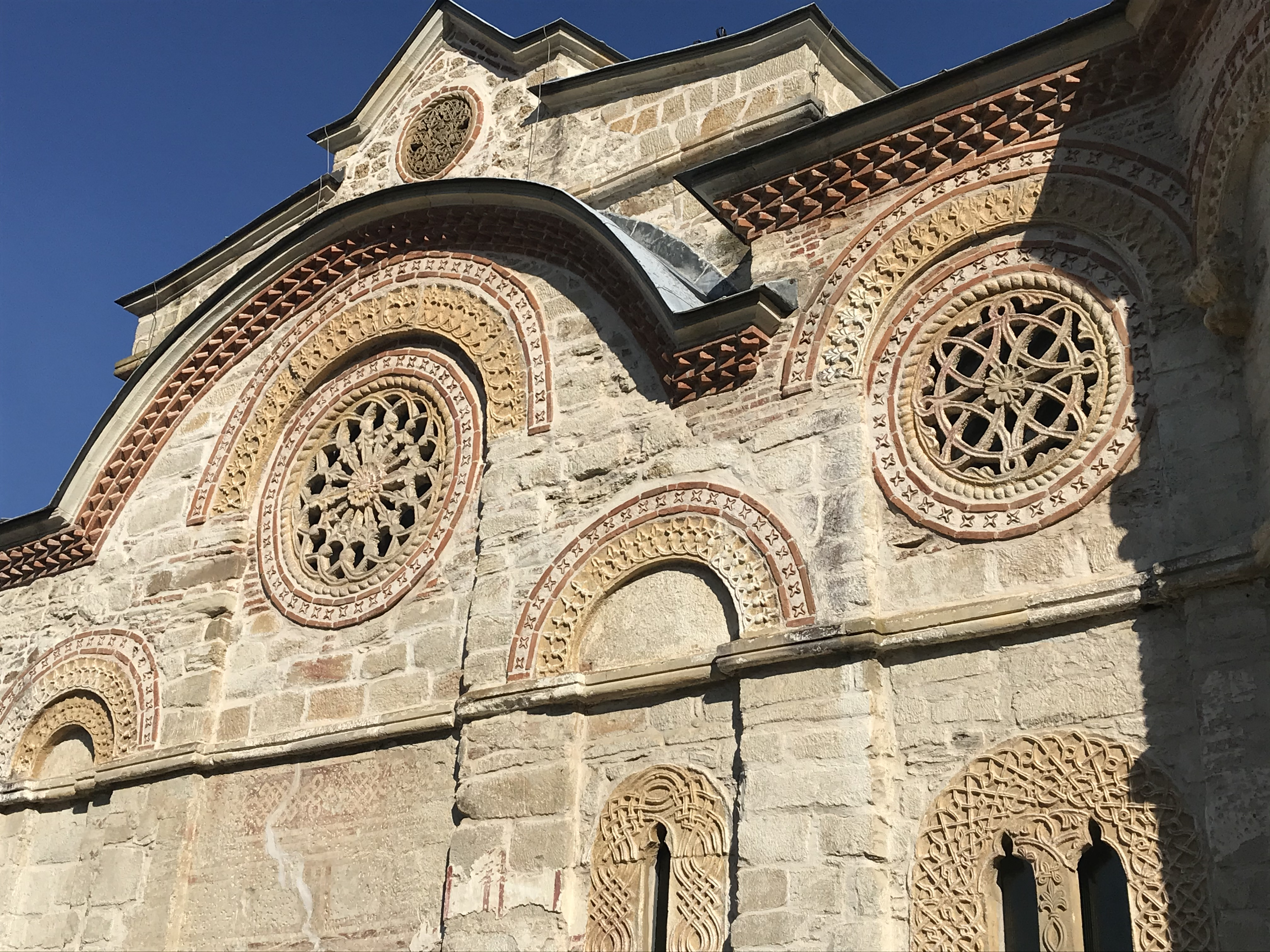
Wall ornamentation details

Old konak

Entrance to the naos

Wall ornamentation details

Southern side of the temple

Wall ornamentation details

Eastern facade

Royal doors on the iconostasis

== See also ==
- Princess Milica of Serbia
- Battle of Kosovo
- Paraskeva of the Balkans
- Jefimija
- Eparchy of Kruševac
- Serbian monasteries
- Trstenik
- Gothic architecture
- Islamic art
- Moorish architecture
- Morava architectural school
- Healing the paralytic at Bethesda
- Fleur-de-lis
- Rose window

== Sources ==
- Ognjević, Tamara (2020). Blago Srbije - kulturno-istorijska baština. Mladinska knjiga. ISBN 978-86-7928-340-5.
- Vinulović, Ljubica Z. (2020). Žene ktitori i vizuelna kultura Balkana u srednjovekovno i rano moderno doba, od XI do XVI veka. Faculty of Philosophy Belgrade.
- Vukčević, Jelena; Vukašinović, Veroljub (2017). Tragom Jefimije. National University Trstenik. ISBN 978-86-918433-5-9. Archived from the original on 21 February 2022.
- Mišić, Siniša (2014). Kneginja Milica - Monahinja Jevgenija i njeno doba (PDF). Faculty of Philosophy Belgrade. Archived from the original (PDF) on 1 April 2022.
- Ječmenica, Dejan (2014). Kneginja Milica - Monahinja Jevgenija i njeno doba (PDF). Faculty of Philosophy Belgrade. Archived from the original (PDF) on 1 April 2022.
- Gabelić, Smiljka (2007). Zbornik Narodnog muzeja XVIII-2. National Museum.
- Maglovski, Janko (2007). Zbornik Narodnog muzeja XVIII-2. National Museum.
- Todić, Branislav (2007). Vreme podizanja i živopisanja Ljubostinje. Saopštenja br. 39.
- Šuica, Marko (2004). Vlastela kneza Stefana Lazarevića. Godišnjak za društvenu istoriju. ISBN 9788635504520.
- Nikolić, Živojin (2002). Prozraka. Prosveta. ISBN 8674553753.
- Popović, Danica (1992). Srpski vladarski grob.
- Filozof, Konstantin (1989). Life of Despot Stefan Lazarević. Serbian Literary Guild. ISBN 978-86-836972-6-7.
- Kanitz, Felix (1985). Srbija. Zemlja i stanovništvo od rimskog doba do kraja XIX veka, prva knjiga. Serbian Literary Guild. ISBN 9788673600703.
- Đurić, Srđan (1985). Ljubostinja. Crkva Uspenja Bogorodičinog. Republički zavod za zaštitu kulture.
- Ljubinković, Mirjana; Vukadin, Obrenija (1966). Ljubostinja - srednjovekovni manastir. Arheološki pregled br. 8.
- Deroko, Aleksandar (1962). Monumentalna i dekorativna arhitektura u srednjevekovnoj Srbiji. Naučna knjiga.
- Putnik, Sevastijan (1927). Manastir Ljubostinja. Štamparija Đ. Budimirovića.
