= Vratko Nemanjić =

Serbian noble

Vratko Nemanjić Jug Bogdan
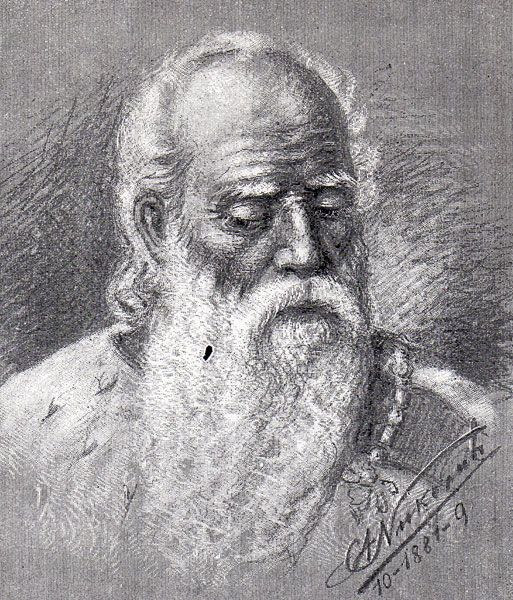
- Elder Jug Bogdan (1881 painting)
- Buried: Davidovica monastery
- Family: Nemanjić
- Issue: Milica – later princess of Serbia (married Tsar Lazar Hrebeljanović) Jugović brothers Nikola
- Father: Vratislav Nemanjić

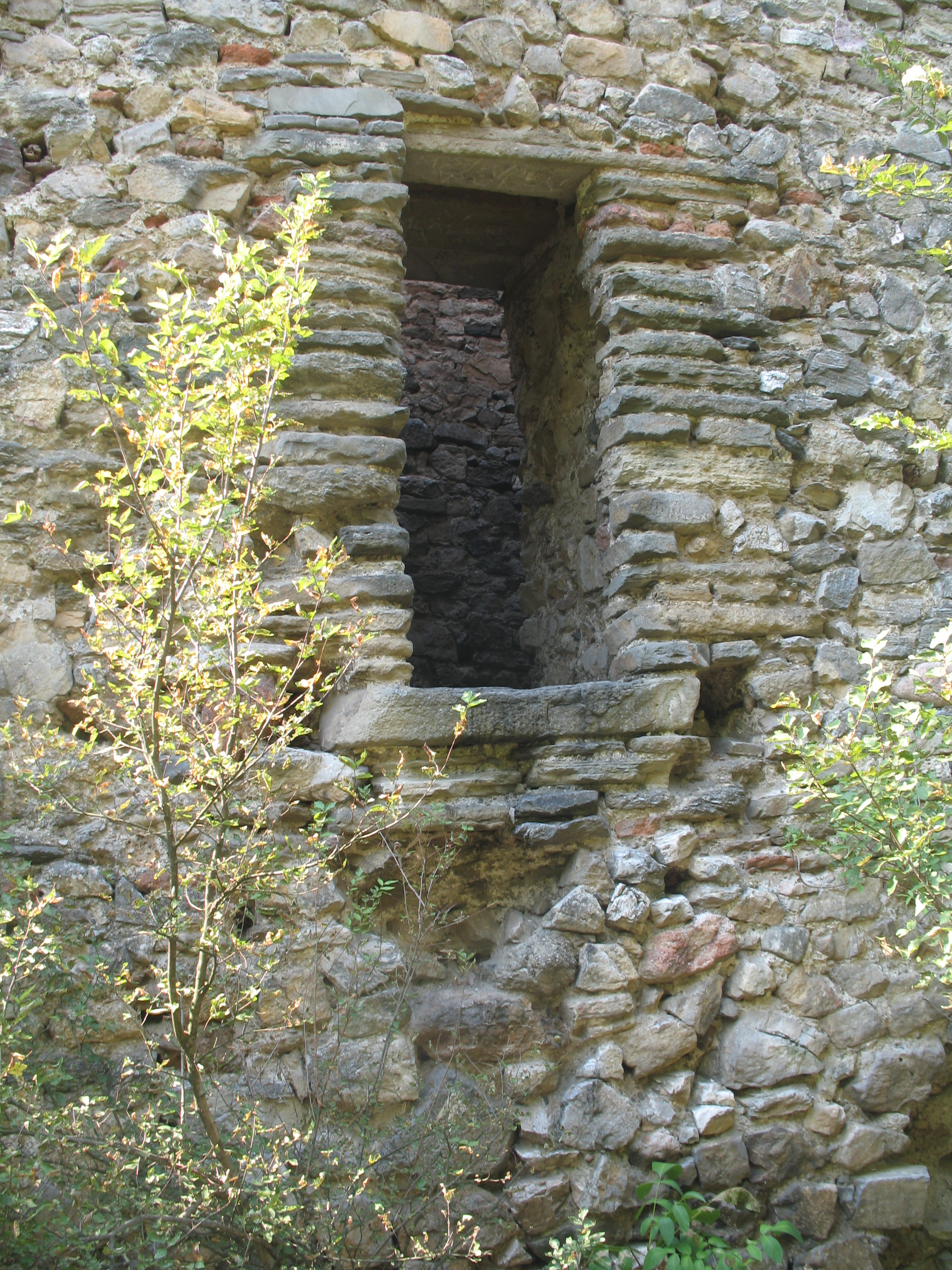
Water Tower of the Prokuplje Fortress

Vratko Nemanjić (Serbian Cyrillic: Вратко Немањић; fl. 1325–1355) was a Serbian nobleman, father of Prince Lazar's spouse Princess Milica of Serbia. Serbian epic poetry identifies him with Jug Bogdan (Југ Богдан, "South Bogdan") or Ljutica Bogdan (Љутица Богдан, "Irate Bogdan"), a mythical hero in the Battle of Kosovo.

== Biography ==
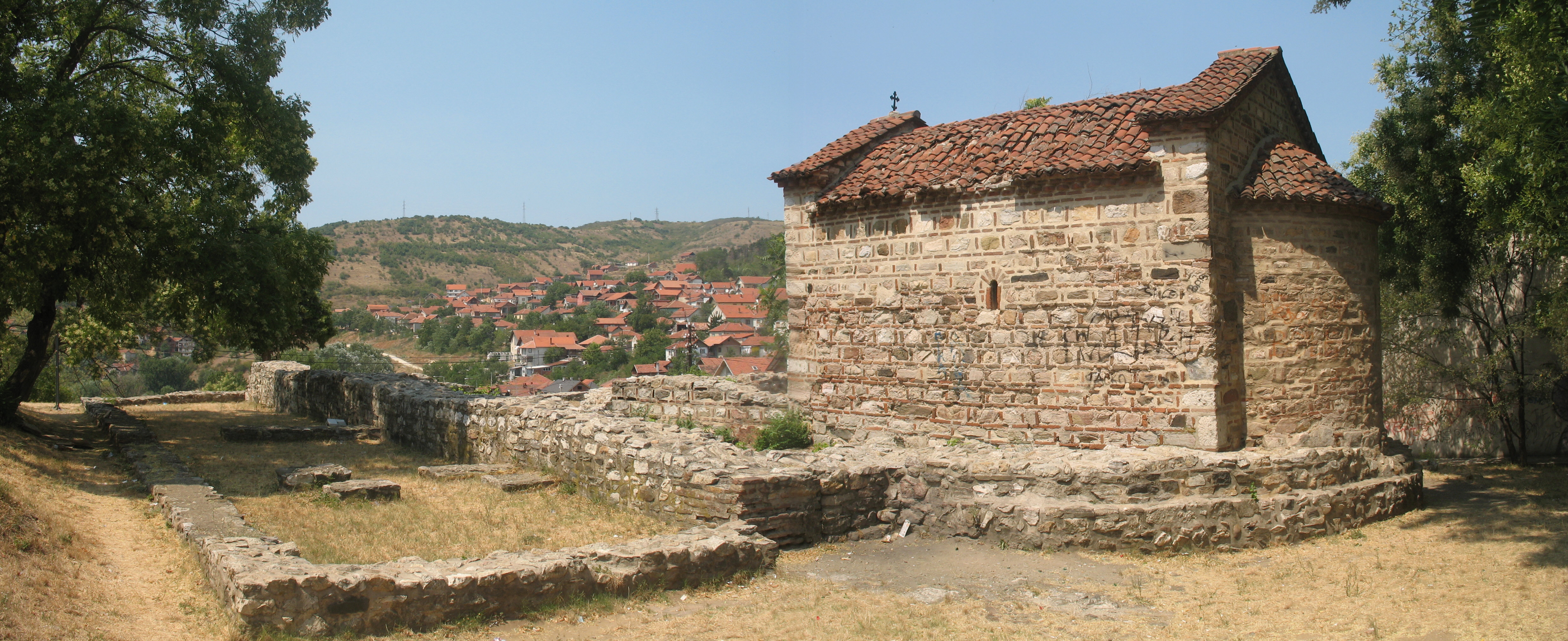
The Church of Jug Bogdan

Member of the ruling Nemanjić dynasty, he was born in the beginning of the 14th century as the son of Vratislav Nemanjic, who held the title of Grand Župan, grandson of Dmitar Nemanjić, a son of Vukan Nemanjić. He was a noble and age-mate of Serb Emperor Stefan Dušan. In 1342, Vratko and Oliver, as allies of John VI Kantakouzenos in the Byzantine civil war of 1341–1347, led the Serbian army to attack Serres. The attack failed disastrously, as dysentery (caused by the excessive consumption of must) befell the attackers, and 1,500 men died of it.

Vratko Nemanjić is identified as the father of at least Župan Nikola—whose inscription from his 1379 burial confirms this—and Milica, the wife of Prince Lazar. He must have been about 80 years old at the time of the Battle of Kosovo.

== Endowments ==
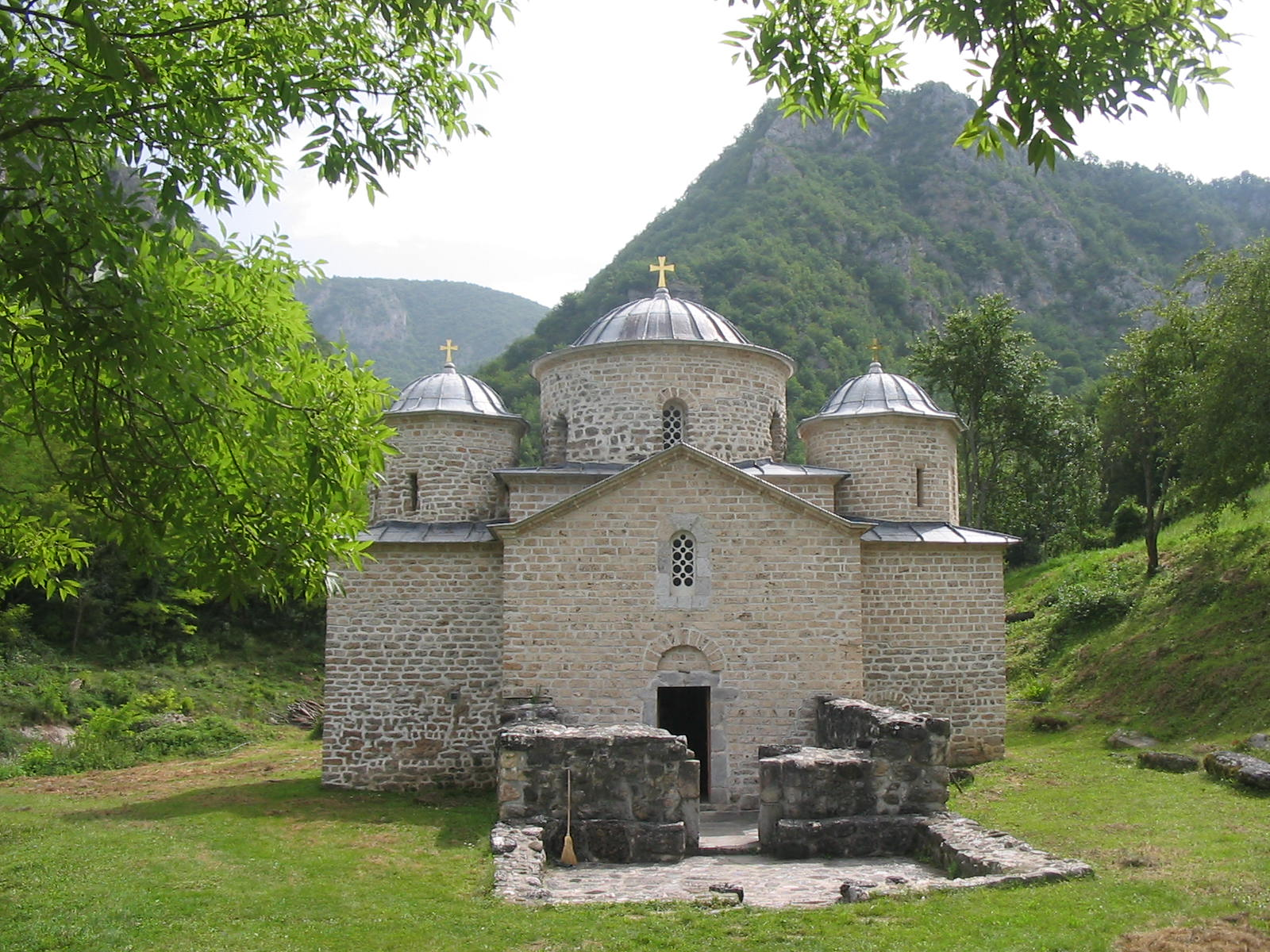
Davidovica monastery, endowment and burial place of Prince Vratko Nemanjic

According to the Serbian epic poem "The girl Margit and the voevod Rajko", Jug Bogdan resided in Hisar, at that time part of the Serbian Empire.

A folk tradition holds that the surrounding region of Bogdanovac was named after him. The 14-meter-tall (46 ft) water tower of the Prokuplje Fortress is popularly called "Bogdan's Tower".

Another tradition holds that Jug Bogdan owned vineyards in the village of Bogdanje (near Trstenik), and that the village was named after him.

== Serbian epic poetry ==
In the Serbian epic poems, Jug Bogdan is the father of the Jugovići (nine Jugović brothers). One of his daughters Anđelija is married to Banović Strahinja, but was kidnapped by Ottoman vassal Vlah Alija.

Strahinja asks Jug Bogdan if he and his brothers-in-law (the Jugovići) could help him rescue her, but Jug Bogdan refused, since Anđelija had slept with the Turk, and brought great shame to the family.

He was killed together with his nine sons by the eighth pasha (the seven before him had been killed) of the Ottoman Empire during the Battle of Kosovo. Where he is said to have fallen is now a monument with a large white cross standing and the inscription:

"Honor to the ancestors who taught us how to create a great fatherland. We will guard it and agree that it is more difficult to guard than to acquire.

Critical historians have suggested Bogdan, a Macedonian magnate, brother of Dejan and Jovan Oliver, as the likely historical model of this hero. Bogdan is mentioned by John VI Kantakouzenos, while Laonikos Chalkokondyles has more details about him.
