= Prokuplje Fortress =

Town in Serbia

Prokuplje Прокупље
- Prokuplje; Serbia
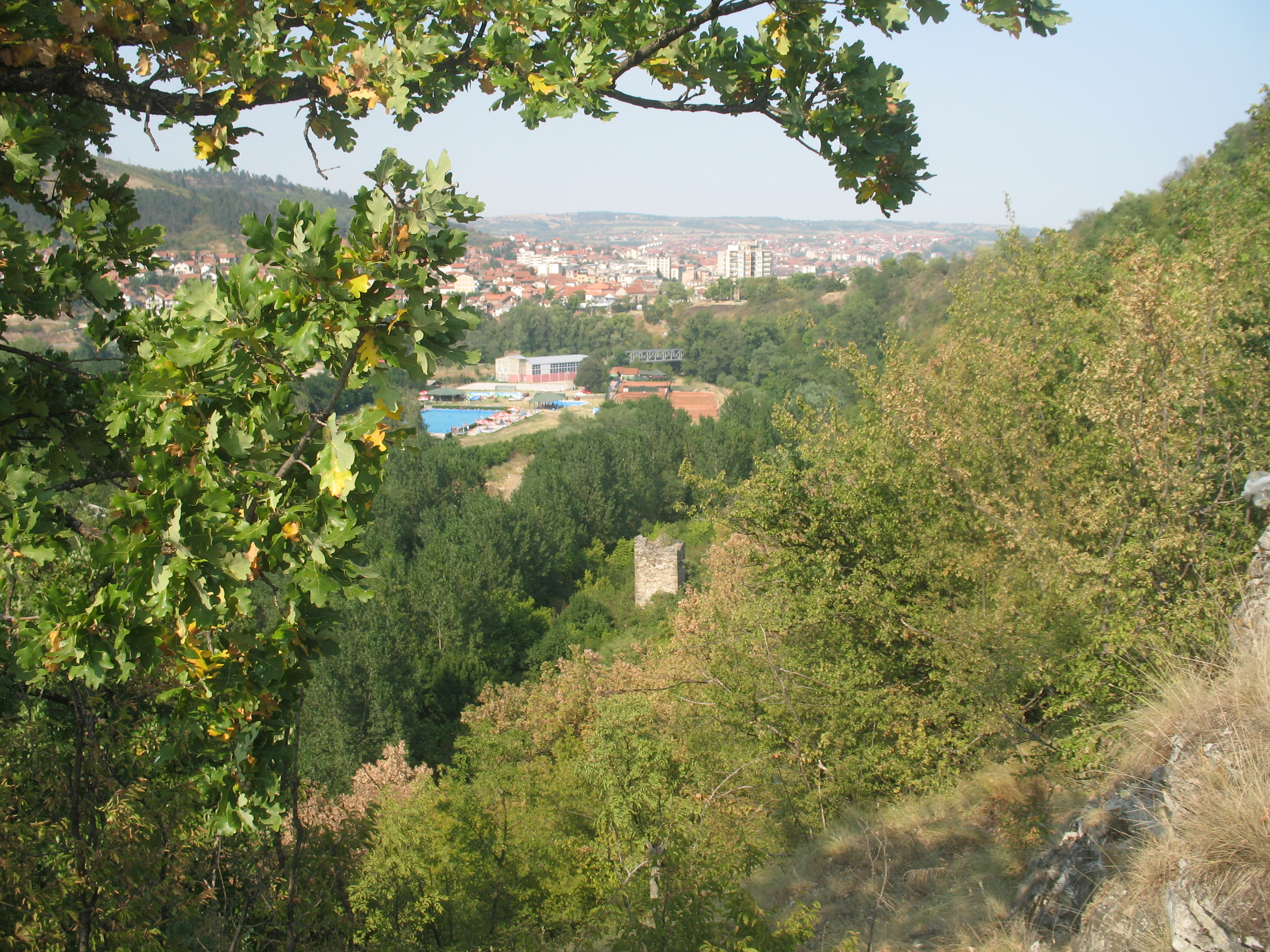
- View on the Jug Bogdan tower from the Hisar hill

Site information
- Type: Fortification
- Open to the public: Yes

Location
- Coordinates: 43°13′36″N 21°34′42″E

Site history
- Built: 14th century
- Built by: Lazar Hrebeljanović
- Materials: Stone

Prokuplje Fortress (Serbian: Прокупље) was a medieval fortified town, located above modern day Prokuplje, Serbia. It is surrounded by Toplica river from three sides.

== History ==
The settlement was known as Hammeum under the rule of Roman Empire, Complos under Byzantium and Toplica during the earliest stages of Serbian rule. Although the locality was settled before, various research provided that the remaining walls were built in the late 14th century, during the rule of Prince Lazar of Serbia, as a defense from the Ottoman invasion. During that period, the fortified town was named as City of St. Procopius, or simply Prokuplje, based on the name of a saint, whose remains were kept in the city since 1386. During this time Serbia developed a sort of wine which was called Prokupac (from the grape of the same name), indicating that the city had a thriving wine-making industry. Under Lazar Hrebeljanović and Stefan Lazarević, Prokuplje enjoyed the same status as Kruševac, Stalać, Bovan, Petrus, and Leskovac. It was an important trading city on the trade route towards the Adriatic coast and Ragusa, as merchants from Dubrovnik enjoyed a good status within the city, as testified by the Latin church which the Ragusan merchants used. It was one of two churches in the core of the old town of Prokuplje, the other being a Serbian Orthodox church.

Prokuplje was first temporarily occupied by the Ottomans in 1440, and then eventually conquered long-term in 1454 during the Ottoman invasion of the Serbian Despotate. Soon afterward, they restored the damaged citadel, where Ottoman crew settled in, while the lower boroughs were inhabited by Ottoman common folk. The fortress was also known as Hissar at this time, as this is the Turkish word for fortress.

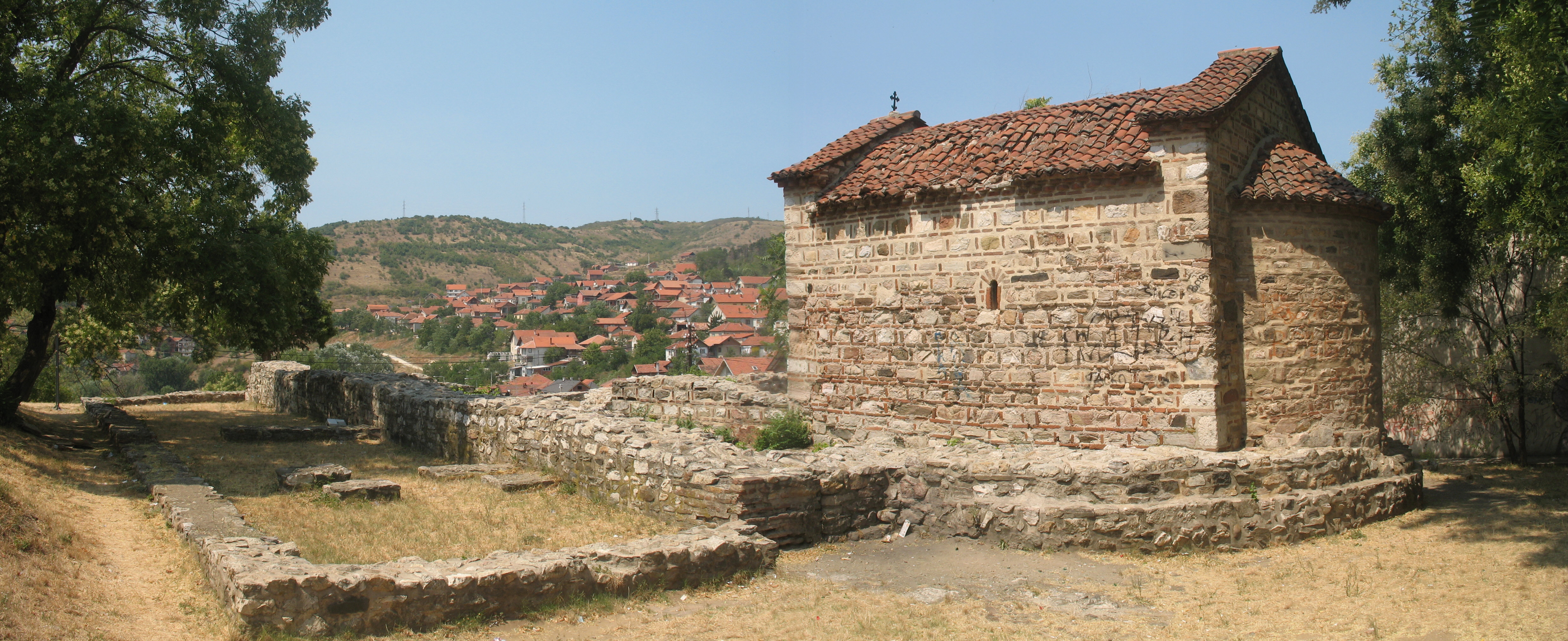
A Latin church, built on the foundations of temple of Heraclius

== Characteristics ==
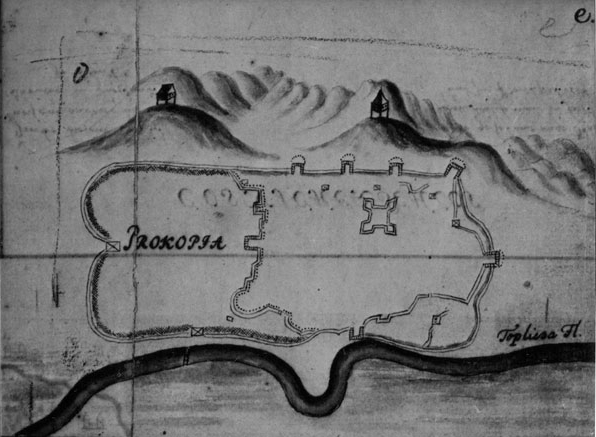
Austrian drawing of Prokuplje from 1689

The fortress consists of a citadel with oval foundation, situated on the highest plateau, from where two concentric bulwarks descend forming two lower boroughs on accessible areas of the hillside. The interior of the citadel was as big as 500 square metres (5,400 sq ft) of surface and had its own water supply via a large water cistern.

The tower of Jug Bogdan, which was an outpost, is in the best shape out of all remains. It is located on Toplica riverbank. Presumably, it served to control crossing over the river, but also to ensure water-supply to the fortress. Jug Bogdan is the name of a Serb voivode Vratko Nemanjić in Serbian epic poetry.

The site on and around Hisar Hill is rich with valuable archeological findings from various eras; there were remains of Roman baths and fortifications, as well as pre-Roman and Byzantine foundations under sections of the lower town. The most common findings include spears and swords, tools for leather works, and ceramic pottery.

Lately, the project of reconstruction and restoration has begun in earnest.
