= Prnjavor (Trstenik) =

- Village
- Location within Serbia
- Coordinates: 43°39′32″N 20°59′34″E
- Country: Serbia
- District: Rasina District
- Municipality: Trstenik

Population (2002)
  - Total: 318
- Time zone: UTC+1 (CET)
  - Summer (DST): UTC+2 (CEST)

Prnjavor is a village in the municipality of Trstenik, Serbia. According to the 2002 census, the village has a population of 318 people.
