= Nikola Marković (painter) =

Serbian painter

Nikola Marković (in Cyrillic Serbian: Никола Марковић; 1843 in Požarevac – 1889 in Belgrade) was a Serbian painter. He mostly painted icons. In 1870, he became a member of the Serbian Learned Society (Srpsko učeno društvo; abbreviated as SUD), now the Serbian Academy of Sciences and Arts.

== Works ==
The life and art of the painters belonging to the Marković family—Milija and his sons Radovan and Nikola—are well known to art historians. Nikola Marković's iconostases are found in Knjazevac, Veliko Orasje, Grocka, and other places:

- Iconostasis of the church of the monastery of Bogovađa (Lajkovac) (in collaboration with his father Milija and his brother Radovan), 1858;
- Iconostasis of the Church of the Holy Trinity in Gornji Milanovac, 1862;
- Iconostasis of the Saint-Gabriel church of Aranđelovac;
- Iconostasis of the Church of the Shroud of the Mother of God of Valjevo, 1865;
- Iconostasis of the Saint-Constantin-et-Sainte-Hélène church in Koceljeva (in collaboration), 1871;
- Iconostasis of the Church of Saint Peter and Saint Paul of Topčider (in collaboration with Stevan Todorović), 1874
- Iconostasis of the church of the Petkovica monastery (Šabac)

== See also ==
- List of Serbian painters
