= Renaissance in Albania =

Historical period

During a similar time to the European Renaissance, a large cultural awakening occurred in Albania. This period, referred to as the "Albanian Renaissance" or the "Arbëresh Renaissance", stemmed from Italy, adopting many humanistic ideas. Literature, art, architecture, education and science experienced a significant growth despite the slower evolution of the Renaissance in Albania. The awakening in Albanian lands was slowed by multiple factors, which included the large exodus of Albanians to Italy and the political situation of the region caused by Ottoman occupation.

Most acclaimed Albanian humanist scholars lived outside the country, such as Luca Matranga, Marin Barleti, Dhimitër Frëngu, Marin Beçikemi, Andrea Alessi, Gjon Gazulli, Marco Basaiti, Nikollë Leonik Tomeu and many others. While sparse, the scholars that remained in Albania played a crucial role in Albanian culture. This includes Gjon Buzuku, who in 1555 wrote the earliest recorded Albanian book, Meshari, Onufri, who revolutionized Albanian art, Pjetër Bogdani, Pjetër Budi and many more.

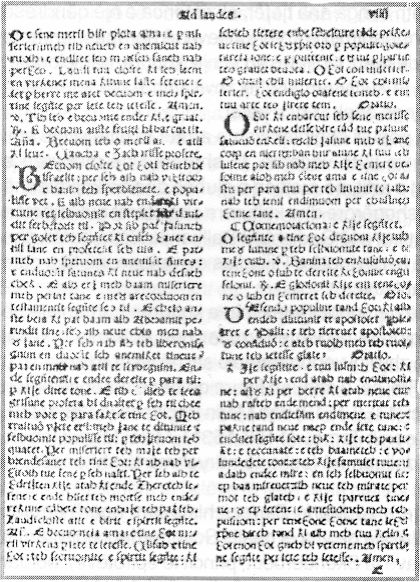
Excerpt from Meshari by Gjon Buzuku, the oldest Albanian book.

Cities such as Scutari, Durrës, Ulcinj, Kotor, Tivar, Vlora and Saranda would become Adriatic trading hubs, where works of the Renaissance would be traded between Albania and the rest of Europe. Inland cities also experienced large urbanization and economical prosperity. Many schools and universities would also be opened across Albania.

Due to the Albanian–Ottoman Wars (1432–1479), the figure of Skanderbeg became a major vocal point among Albanian scholars. The need to form a "National identity" also led to the need for the preservation of the Albanian language, especially during the 16th–17th centuries.

== Background ==
Before the Renaissance, Albania had little development in science and in preserving its own language. Most schools focused on religious studies instead of scientific ones. In terms of literature, Albanians did not use their own language. Despite having their own, in books, documents, and daily interactions they would use Greek or Latin. This usage of foreign languages was also documented by the bishop of Tivar, Guillem Adam, who in a letter to the French king in 1332 would state:

Although the Albanians have another language totally different from Latin, they still use Latin letters in all their books.

The first known document originally written in Albanian is the "Baptismal formula" by the bishop of Durrës, Pal Engjëlli, in 1462, which today is located in the library of Florence. The second oldest document is Arnold Ritter von Harff's lexicon written in 1496. The third earliest document is a part of the Easter Gospel Pericope thought to have been written around the late 15th century – early 16th.

The Renaissance started in the region of Tuscany, primarily in the city of Florence and marked the transition between the Middle Ages and modernity. Despite there being no exact start and end date of the Renaissance, proponents of a "Long Renaissance" argue that the period began in the 14th century (Trecento) and lasted until the 17 century (Seicento). It would later spread to Venice, the heart of a Mediterranean Empire which had control of the Eastern trade routes since participating in the Crusades and due to the voyages of Marco Polo. The Italian trade routes across the Mediterranean Sea and beyond were turned into conduits of culture and knowledge. Humanism, an intellectual movement embraced by scholars, writers and civic leaders in the 14th century also gained popularity in Europe, aiding the spread of the Renaissance ideas. Founded by Italian scholar and poet Francesco Petrarca, the movement reacted against the utilitarian approach to education, seeking to create a citizenry able to speak and write with eloquence and able to engage the civic life of their communities.

The Italian Renaissance laid the foundation for the Albanian Renaissance, with its ideas reaching Albania through books and documents, which were traded through Adriatic cities such as Scutari, Durrës, Ulqin, Kotor, and Tivar. Due to Ottoman rule and the large migration of Albanians to Italy, the Renaissance developed at a slower pace compared to the rest of Europe. This led to most Albanian scholars moving to foreign countries where they created literary, artistic, philosophical and scientific works. Many Albanians would also move to Italy for educational purposes, where they would study in Italian universities. Scholars that remained in Albania fused the ideas of humanism with Albanian tradition, religion and folklore. The Albanian Renaissance was characterized by the first known attempts of preserving the Albanian language, laying the stepstones for the Albanian National Awakening in the 19th century.

== Literature ==
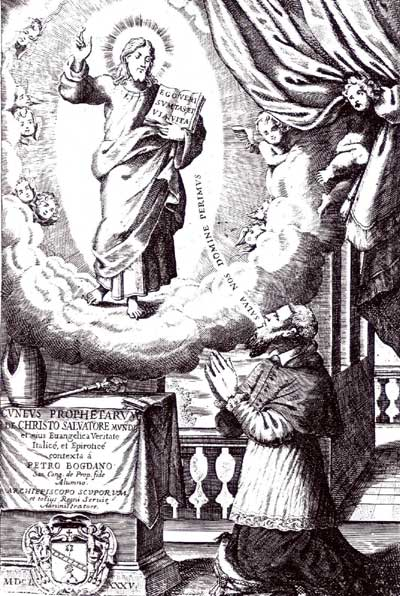
Front Cover of the first edition of Cuneus Prophetarum in 1685

Albanian writers that remained in Albania, known as Old Albanian authors, sought out to prevent the assimilation of the Albanian language by creating Christian, literary and cultural works. From these authors the most notable were Gjon Buzuku, Pjetër Bogdani, Pjetër Budi, and Frang Bardhi. Gjon Buzuku wrote the first Albanian book, Meshari, in 1555, a translation of the main parts of the Catholic Liturgy into Albanian. The book also contains the liturgies of the main religious holidays of the year, comments from the book of prayers, excerpts from the Bible, and excerpts from the ritual and catechism. Pjetër Bogdani would also publish a book focused on Catholicism, the Band of Prophets (Cuneus Prophetarum). Pjetër Budi is another writer known for his works and translations on religion which would be published in Rome, and in 1618 he wrote 100 pages of prose as well as 3,200 verses of poetry, which would be published in the Christian Doctrine. He is also known for writing the book "Pasqyra e të rrëfyemit" Frang Bardhi was another notable Albanian writer and bishop, who in 1635 published the first Albanian dictionary, Dictionarium latino-epiroticum (Latin-Albanian dictionary), and in 1636 he wrote a biography about Skanderbeg, titled The Apology of Scanderbeg.

=== Diaspora literature ===
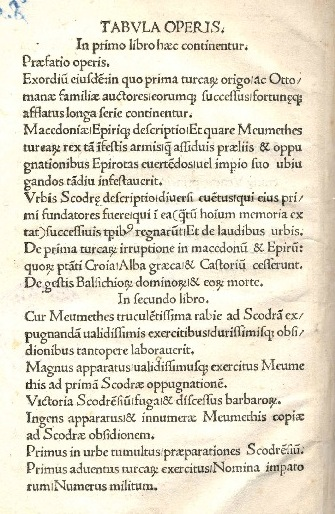
A page from the Siege of Shkodra by Marin Barleti

From the Albanian authors that lived outside of Albania, the most notable would be Demetrio Franco (Dhimitër Frëngu), Marin Barleti, Marin Beçikemi, Anonimi Tivaras, Luca Matranga and Gjon Muzaka. One of the earliest books written by the Albanian diaspora was Historia Skanderbegiae (History of Skanderbeg), also known as History of the Kastrioti named Skanderbeg, published in 1480 in Venice by Anonimi Tivaras. Other books published on Skanderbeg during this time were Siege of Shkodra and Historia de vita et gestis Scanderbegi Epirotarum principis (1504) by Marin Barleti. and Gli illustri e gloriosi gesti e vittoriose imprese fatte contro i Turchi dal Signor Don Georgio Castriotto detto Scanderbeg, principe d' Epiro by Dhimitër Frëngu, who also wrote a biography on him. Marin Beçikemi would be another author known for his works on Albania after the Ottoman invasion, as well as the translation of ancient Roman texts. Luca Mataranga wrote the second known book in Albanian, "E mbsuame krështerë", published in Rome during 1592. Gjon Muzaka is known for writing the Muzaka chronicles in 1510, a series of documents which describe the history of the Muzaka Principality as well as the other Albanian noble houses during the Middle Ages, however Gjon Muzaka is criticized for his chronicles having "bias" with him depicting his house as a higher one oppose to the others.

The publishing of many works by the Albanian diaspora would be done with the help of Bernardino Vitali, an Albanian printer and publisher.

The spread of Humanism amongst the Albanian diaspora influenced their appraising of Skanderbeg, with his figure being materialized in many of the first Albanian historiographic works. Skanderbeg's figure and persona during the 15th century inspired many Albanian immigrants, leading to him being the subject of the works of multiple Albanian diaspora scholars, of which the first was Barleti.

=== Poetry ===
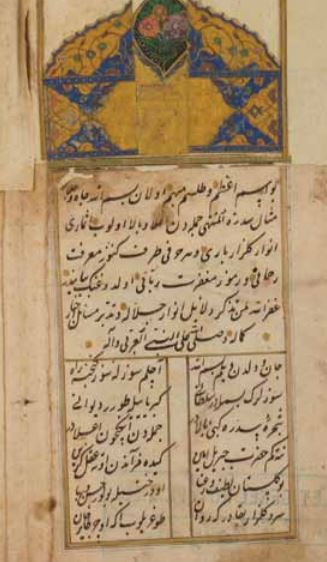
Extract from Gencine-i Raz, a diwan poem of Yahya bey Dukagjini.

During the 16th-17th centuries poetry would also experience a growth in popularity. Most Albanian poets from this time would live in Istanbul, writing diwan poetry in the Ottoman Turkish alphabet. Many of these poems would play a crucial role in classical Turkish literature and in the Timurid Renaissance. Of these poets, the most notable were Mesihi of Prishtina, Yahya bey Dukagjini and Suzi Çelebi. Mesihi is known for writing the poem "Murabba' -i bahâr" (Ode to Spring) which would later be translated by Orientalist William Jones. It remained for a long time as the best known Turkish poem in Europe. Yahya Bey Dukagjini also played a crucial role in Albanian-Ottoman poetry. He is known for writing a Khamsa of five poems, from which the most famous are "Shâh u gedâ" (The King and the Beggar) and "Yusuf ve Züleyha" (Yusuf and Züleyha), a poem which regards the romance and love of two youths. Suzi Çelebi is known for writing the epic poem "Gazavatname Mihaloğlu", which narrates the 15th century Ottoman conquest of the Balkans as well as the glory and battles of Ottoman commander Mihaloğlu Ali Bey. Çelebi also founded the first open library in the Ottoman Balkans in Prizren.

== Art ==
The 14th century marked a significant improvement for Albanian art, even despite the usage of solely the Byzantine style. This period led to the rise of iconography, where many murals and frescoes where painted on churches and monasteries. The "Epitaph of Gllavenica", painted in 1373 in the Church of St. Mary in Ballsh, was the most important artistic work of the time, showing the resurrection of Jesus. Due to the Ottoman invasion and its multiple battles, many iconographic documents, as well as old woodcuts from the 12th–13th centuries would be destroyed. The Fall of Constantinople marked a "severing" of the Albanian-Byzantine cultural connections, causing a change in style of Albanian iconography to a unique style which included a mixture of post-Byzantine, traditional Albanian and Italian Renaissance art styles.

In Albania, the most notable painters were Onufri and his son Nikolla. The artistic works of this period, especially from Onufri, would leave an influence on Albanian art up until the 19th century. Onufri introduced a new style of painting with him using natural color dies as well as introducing the color pink into paintings. He also established the first Albanian art school in Berat, which would later be passed down to Nikolla. After Nikolla, the university was given to Onufri Cypriota. Cypriota took many elements from Onufri, including the signing of artworks, something which had not been practiced in Albanian before the Renaissance. An original element of Onufri Cypriota's work was the adding of text to his artworks. His most notable paintings "Prayers" and "Christ the Almighty" (icons).

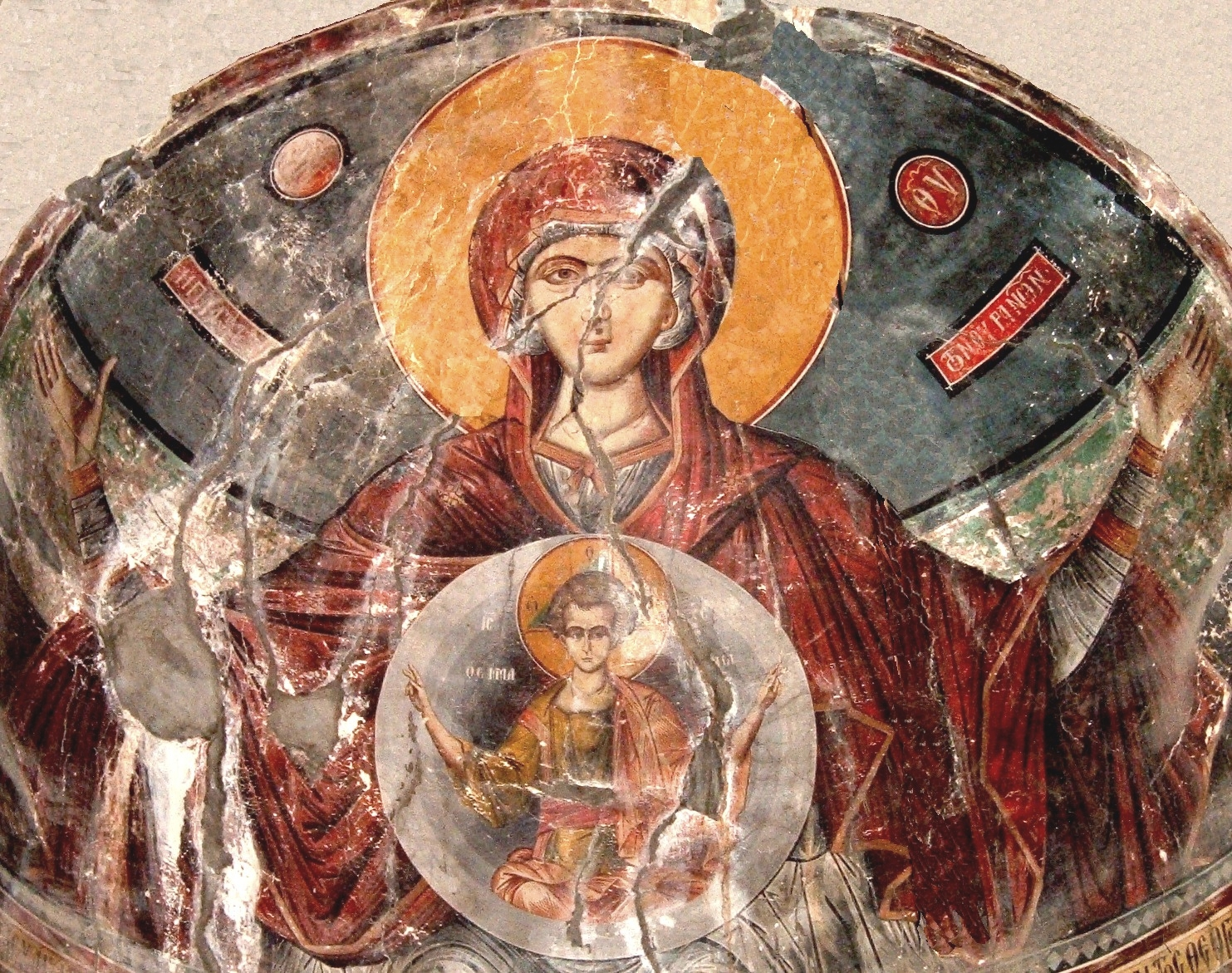
Fresco in the Holy Apostles church in Kastoria painted by Onufri

Some sources also state that the famous Venetian painter, Marco Basaiti, came from an Albanian family, with him also writing texts and supporting the Albanian school of Venice. Basaiti created 30 known artworks, including "Call of the Sons of Zebedee", "Portrait of a Young man", "Agony in the Garden" and "Lamentation". Many modern historians consider Basaiti as one of the last masters of the early Renaissance, with his works demonstrating a refined quattrocento style.

== Science and Philosophy ==
During the Renaissance the most practiced fields of science were Medicine, Mathematics and Astronomy. One of the most notable Albanian humanists that studied science was Gjon Gazuli, a professor at the University of Padua. Gazuli's "expertise" were mathematics and astronomy, with his scientific works receiving praise across Italy and Hungary. Nicholas Leonicus Thomaeus (Albanian: Nikollë Leonik Tomeu) is also considered to be an Italian-born Albanian scientist and philosopher, though some sources refer to him as Greek. Tomeo was a teacher at the University of Padua, lecturing about Ancient Greek texts, mainly those by Aristotle. Tomeo also wrote a series of Latin philosophical dialogues in 1524, the first of which was "Trophonius, sive, De divinatione". His most notable work is the "Opuscula".

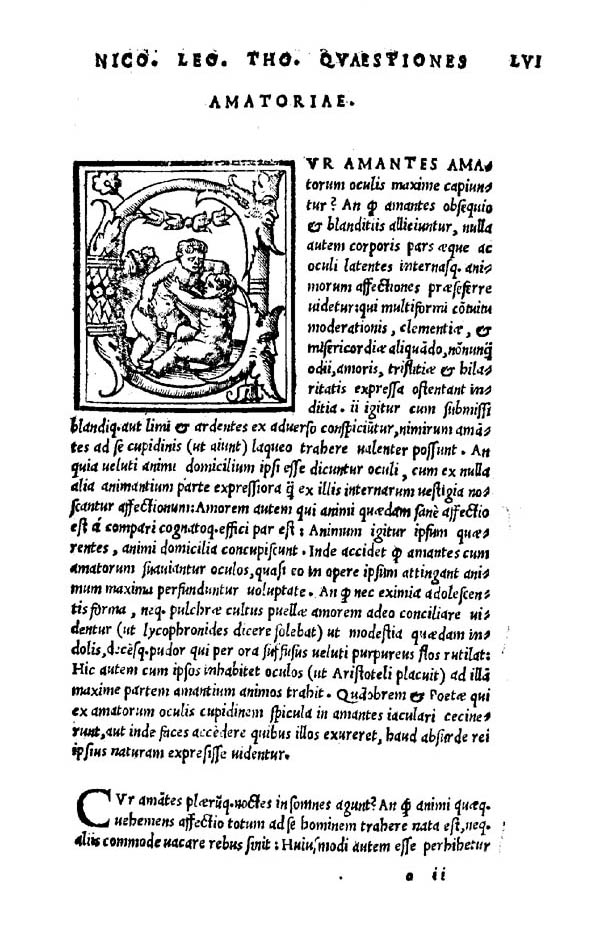
A page of the Opuscula by Nikollë Leonik Tomeu.

Medicine during the Albanian Renaissance was mainly practiced through means of Traditional medicine. This form of medicine gained popularity among the Northern Albanians, who used endemic plants, mainly Sideritis (mountain tea) and Origanum Vulgare for herbal treatments. Research from the 2000s showed that these treatments were effective for anti-inflammatory and antimicrobial properties.

=== Education ===
Previously the main form of education in Albania came from Monasteries or churches where the main subject was theology. This education system aimed to make students grow up and be monks or priests. This form of education became widespread during the 13th century with the arrival of Franciscan and Dominican missionaries, who opened several churches in larger cities. The Renaissance would bring the appeal of critical thinking to education, leading to the teachings of the seven liberal arts (both trivium and quadrivium). The University of Dyrrhachium would "flourish" during this time; however, it would be abandoned by its staff in the Ottoman invasion. They opened two new universities in Tivar and Zadar. Many Albanians living outside of the country would also achieve education in multi-cultural colleges such as the College of Loreto and the Illyrian College of Fermo. Education among Albanians in Italy would also be received in the Albanian school of Venice also known as "Scuola degli Albanesi" established by Albanian immigrants between 1500 and 1504. Although primarily serving as a trade school, students would also receive general education. It would operate until the 18th century, with it educating the children of some of the most notable Albanian humanist scholars. The institution would be supported by many key-figures of the Albanian and Italian Renaissance's, including Italian artist Vittore Carpaccio who painted several murals in the school. Schools were also established; however, the earliest known schools come in the later Renaissance period. The earliest known Albanian school is the school of Veles in Mirdita, opened in 1632, but there was also a school opened in Kurbinë the same year which could have been older. Other schools included the school of Himarë, the school of Pllana in Karadak, of Blinisht, of Shkodër, Orosh, Janjevë, Durrës, Gjakova, and Peja.

== Architecture ==
Architecture was another field which gained popularity in Albania with the coming of the Renaissance. The most famous artistic works from the Albanian renaissance are of the architectural type, which survived multiple invasions, different from other art works. Albanian Renaissance architecture had influence from the Byzantine, Roman and Gothic styles. Most famous Albanian architects at this time worked on projects outside of Albania, mainly in the Ottoman Empire and Italy. From the architects of the Ottoman Empire were Architect Kasemi and Sedefkar Mehmed Agha, while from the architects that worked in Italy, the most famous was Andrea Alessi, who began his career there before moving to Dalmatia where he would carry out the rest of his work. From architectural works in Albanian lands, only a handful of monuments built around the 14th-15th centuries, mainly churches, remain such as the Churches of Shirgji, St. Stephan, Vaut in Deja, Berat and Myzeqe. After the Ottoman invasion most churches would be destroyed and replaced with mosques.

Architect Kasem and Mehmed Agha were famous for working on mosques in Istanbul, with their style having large ottoman influence. Mehmed Agha is famous for constructing the Blue Mosque also known as the Sultan Ahmed Mosque. Architect Kasem would be another famous architect who is known for works such as the Baghdad Kiosk, Revan Kiosk and Tiled Kiosk in the Topkapı Palace, as well as the projecting of the Spice Bazaar in Istanbul which is the second largest covered shopping mall. Kasem would also create many structures in Albania such as inns, bridges, roads and baths.

Some also theorise that the Ottoman architect Mimar Sinan, who was one of the architects of the Topkapı Palace who also projected many other bridges and mosques in Ottoman lands, to have been of Albanian origin.

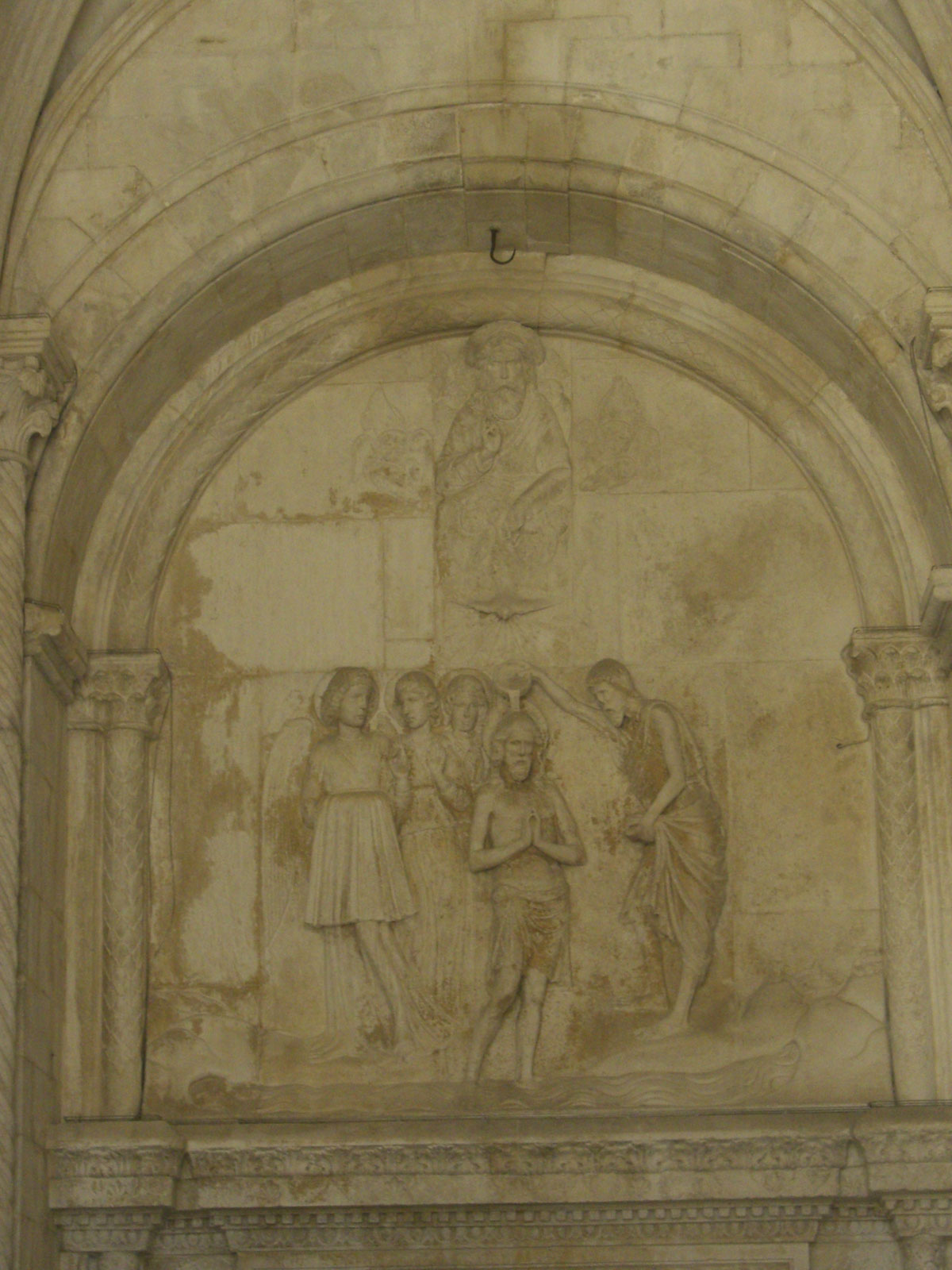
Entrance detail designed by Andrea Alessi in the Trogir Cathedral

Andrea Alessi would be another architect famous for his unique style. His most notable work was the Baptistry of Trogir, located in Trogir, Croatia. Alessi also projected many merchant statues and cathedral expansions. Most of his work would be carried out in Dalmatia.

The Albanian Renaissance also brought a period of urbanization, where new cities were built over old ones. The 14th and 15th centuries also led to the building of apartments and housing, mainly built by using stone for the walls and straw for the roofs. During the Ottoman rule several bazaars were built in the cities of Albania and Kosovo. Bazaars such as the baazar of Peja, Gjakova, Pristina, Korçë and Shkodër were turned into large Balkan trading hubs.

The early Renaissance architecture of Albania also saw the construction of several castles and fortresses. Walls were raised around the city centers, while neighborhoods were left outside of the walls. This form of castle building would later be known as "Varosh" and was practiced by several Albanian feudal lords. In the late 14th century castles with taller walls and towers gained popularity, due to the difficulty of climbing them during siege. During this same period smaller fortifications were built near river banks to ensure the safety of trade routes. Of these castles, the most significant were the Castle of Rodoni Gorge, Pirgu, Semani, Ishmit and Shkumbin. Another form of fortification which became widespread in the mountainous regions of Albania were the "Kullas", single tower stone fortifications built by feudal lords. In the 15th century, the usage of artillery led to the Albanians building new fortresses that could repel artillery sieges. Albanian lords and architects, inspired by the castles of the Apennine Peninsula, build fortifications with walls and towers that were similar in height with each other, and could be used as vantage points for artillery in case of a siege. The most notable fortresses were the Fortress of Cape Rodon, built in 1463 by Skanderbeg, and the artillery tower of Durrës. Castle building would continue under Ottoman rule in the 16th century. Under Suleiman the Magnificent several castles, such as the Vlorë and Lëkurësi castles would be built.

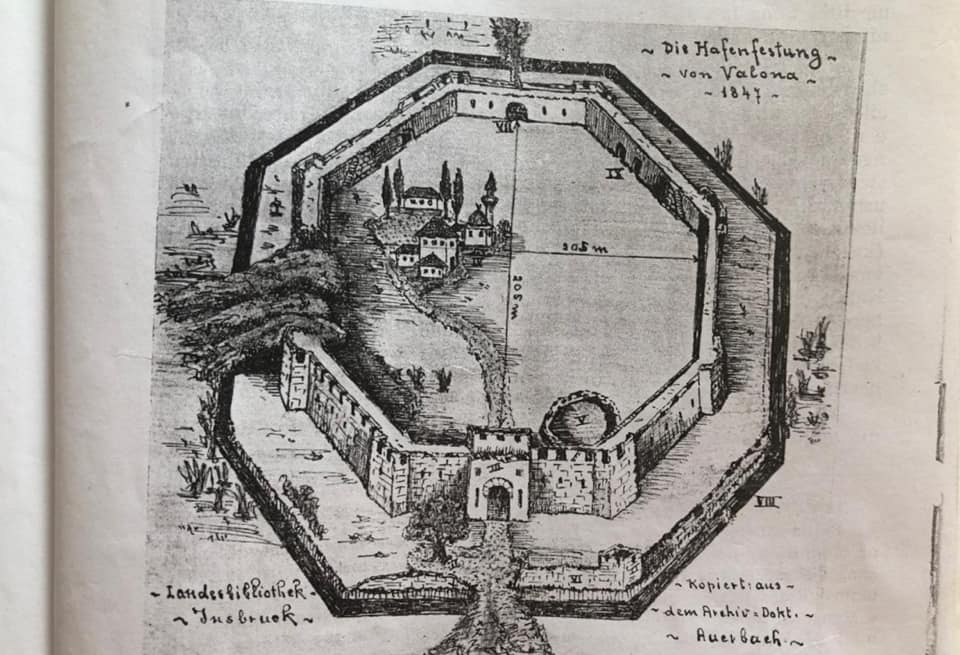
Drawing of Vlorë Castle

== Important figures ==
=== Anonimi Tivaras ===
Anonimi Tivaras (Anonymous Tivaras), also known as Antivarino, is an unknown Albanian writer who wrote Historia Skanderbegiae (History of Skanderbeg), the first biography on Skanderbeg, published in 1480. He would first be mentioned when his book was used as a source by Italian historian Giammaria Biemmi, who would state that Anonimi Tivaras's brother was an officer of Skanderbeg. The information mentioned in his work matches that of Marin Barleti's. His identity remains unknown, and copies of his original book are lost due to the author having "poor Latin".

=== Pal Engjëlli ===
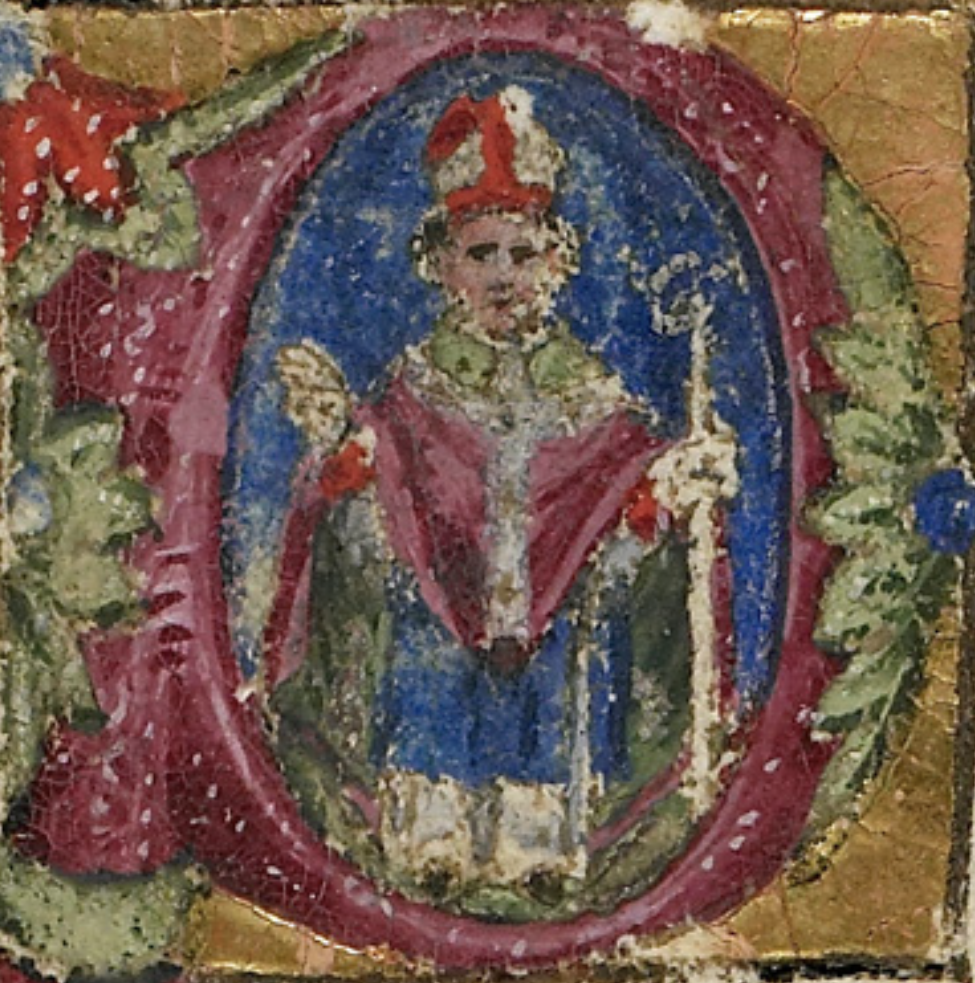
Miniature portrait from 1464 of Pal Engjëlli.

Pal Engjëlli (1416–1470) was an Albanian prelate of the Roman Catholic Church and archbishop of Durrës. He wrote the first Albanian document and also served and important role in the advancement of diplomacy in Albania during the early renaissance. He was born into the feudal Engjëlli family and would serve as a counselor of Skanderbeg. He would do several diplomatic missions across Europe during this time and would also convince Lekë Dukagjini to betray the Ottomans.

=== Marin Barleti ===
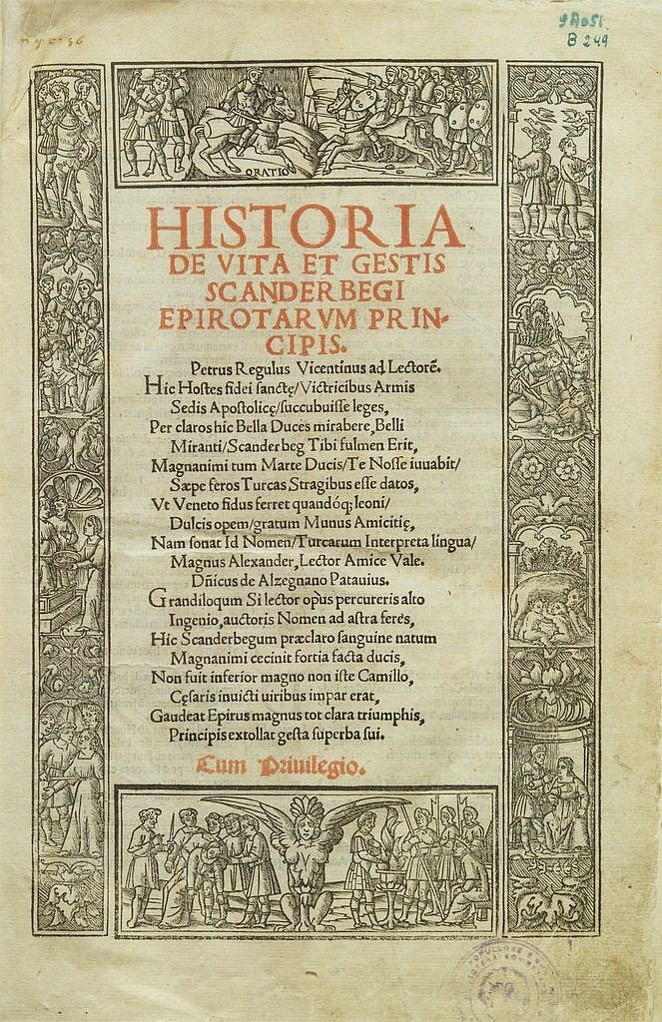
A page from Historia de vita et gestis Scanderbegi Epirotarum principis

Marin Barleti (1450-1454–1512) was an Albanian humanist, historian, writer, and priest from Shkodër. He is considered as the first Albanian historian due to him being an eyewitness to the Siege of Shkodra, on which he based his first book. His reputation as a historian was furthermore cemented in 1504 with the publishing of Historia de vita et gestis Scanderbegi Epirotarum principis (The history of the life and deeds of Skanderbeg, the Prince of Epirus). His third and lesser-known work is titled A Brief History of Lives of Popes and Emperors. After leaving Albania he was given Venetian citizenship and a stall at a meat market in Rialto before becoming a priest after his theological studies at Venice and Padua. He would later be appointed to serve at St. Stephens Church in Piovene. Despite the title of first Albanian historian, Barleti fabricated several events to match his interpretations.

=== Dhimitër Frëngu ===
Dhimitër Frëngu, also known as Demetrio Franco (1443–1525), was an Albanian historian and writer born in Drivast. He was a cousin of Pal Engjëlli and served under Skanderbeg. After the Ottoman invasion, he settled in Italy, where he wrote his two most known works, the biography on Skanderbeg in 1480 and Gli illustri e gloriosi gesti e vittoriose imprese fatte contro i Turchi dal Signor Don Georgio Castriotto detto Scanderbeg, principe d' Epiro.

=== Marin Beçikemi ===
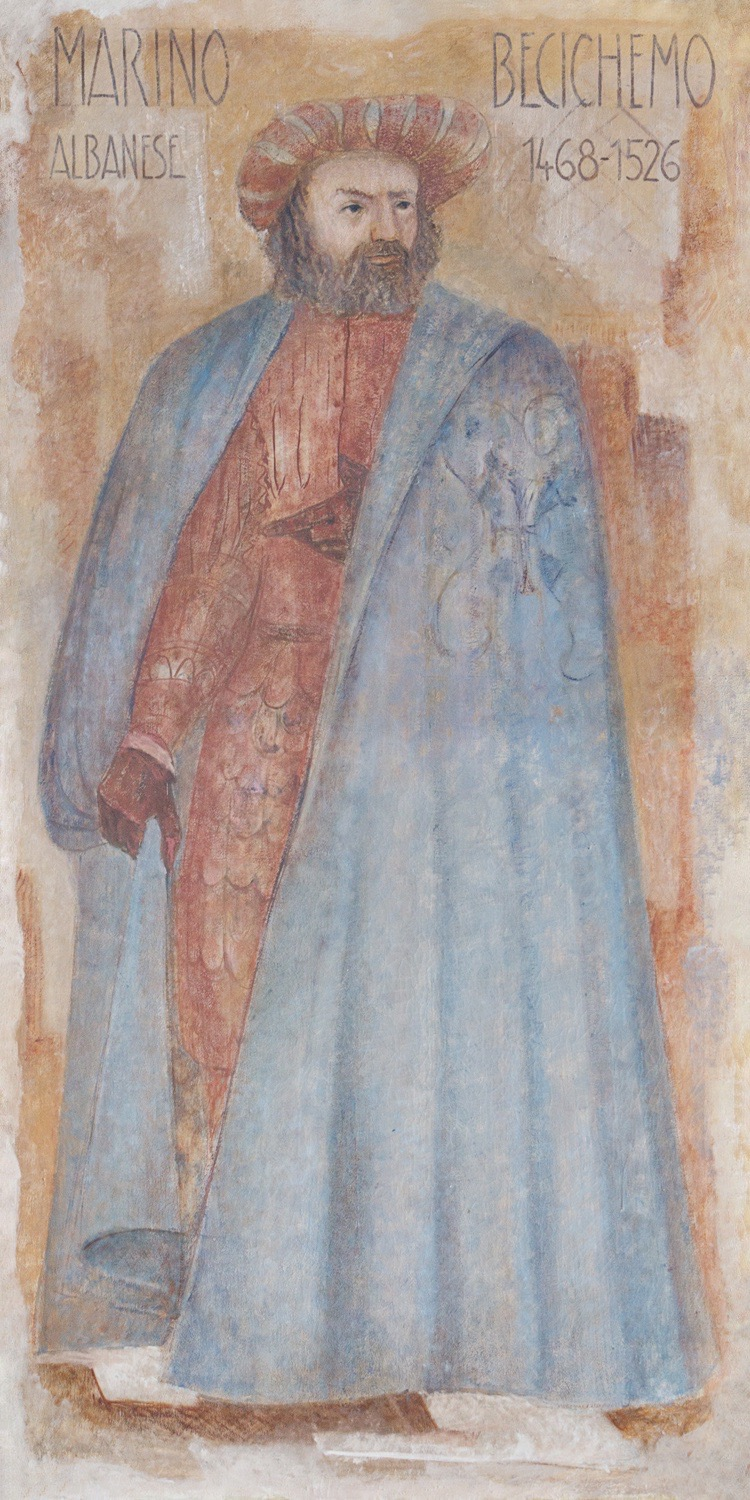
A standing portrait of Marin Beçikemi (1492)

Marin Beçikemi (1468–1526), also known in Italian as Marino Becichemo, was an orator, teacher, and writer from Shkodra. He would spend most of his life in Brescia where he studied Latin and ancient Greek. Beçikemi worked as a professor in both the universities of Brescia and Padua. He is known for his works on ancient philosophers and writers, the most notable of which was Castigationes et observationes in Virgilium, Ovidium, Ciceronem, Servium et Priscianum. In 1495, he was dedicated to the Ragušan Senate, where he befriended humanist Ivan Gučetić. In 1500, Marin Beçikemi gained Venetian citizenship.

=== Gjon Buzuku ===
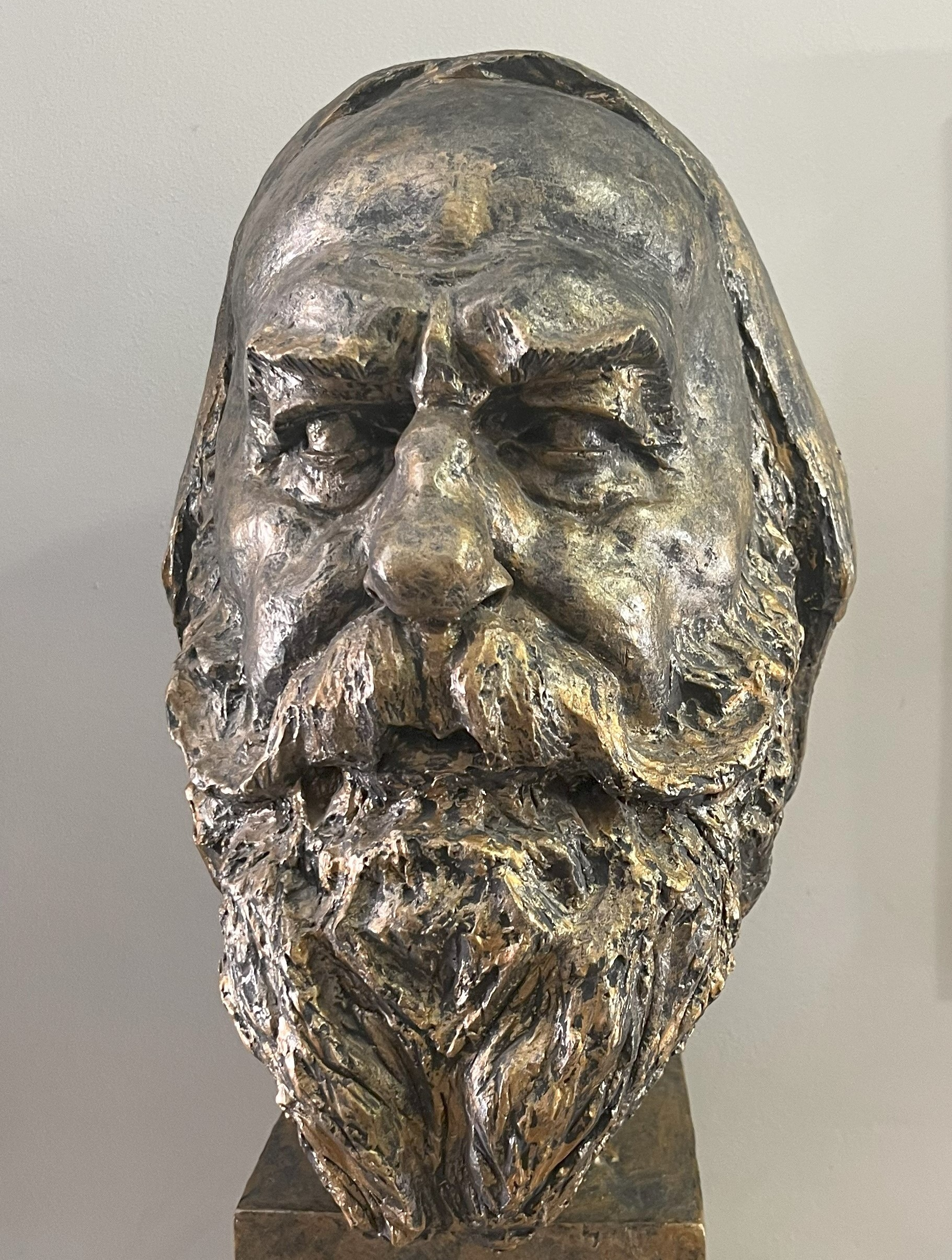
A sculpture of Gjon Buzuku

Gjon Buzuku (1499–1577) was an Albanian priest and author known for his attempts at conserving the Albanian language. His famous "Meshari", is one of the most crucial books in the history of the Albanian language. Buzuku is believed by scholars to have worked for a short amount of time as a priest in the church of Venice. Little is known about his personal life or family, as both the front and back pages of his book which could have held information about himself are lost. His only known family member is his father, Bdek (Benedict) Buzuku.

=== Pjetër Budi ===
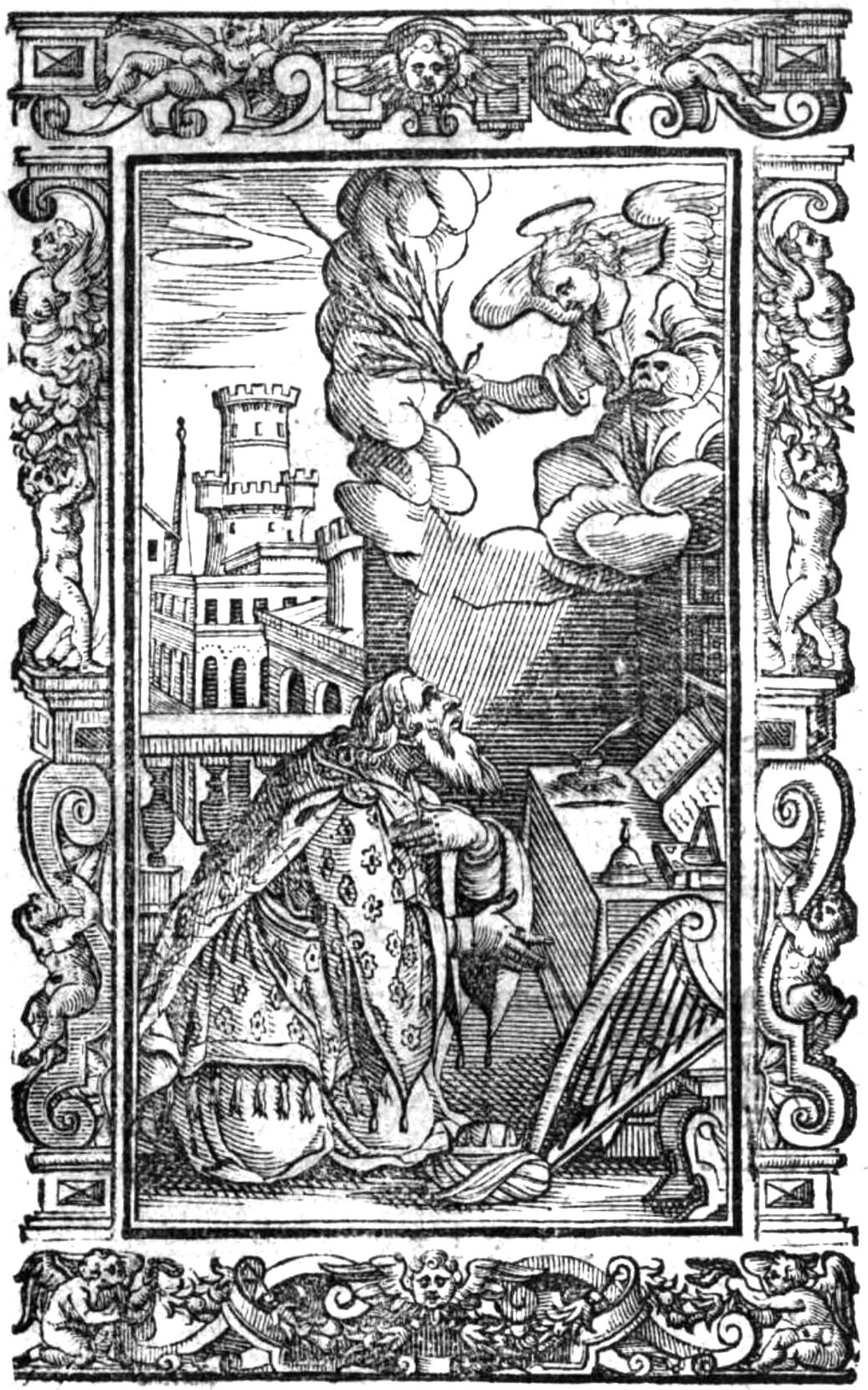
Sketch of Pjetër Budi from his book Speculum confessionis.

Pjetër Budi (1566–1622) was an Albanian bishop, writer, and poet born in Gur i Bardhë. He would become a famous poet, writing 3,300 lines of poetry. Budi completed his studies at the Illyrian College of Loreto for priesthood. In 1599 he was appointed Vicar general of the Catholic church in Serbia, a position which he would hold for seventeen years, before leaving to become the bishop of the Diocese of Sapë. He is known for publishing the "Christian Doctrine" (Doktrina e Kërshtenë), one of the earliest Albanian books. It was published in Rome in 1618. Pjetër Budi died in December 1622 while crossing the Drin river.

=== Pjetër Bogdani ===
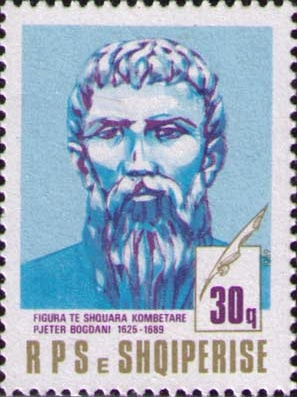
Pjetër Bogdani on a stamp.

Pjetër Bogdani (1627–1689) was a scholar, priest, writer, poet, and resistance fighter from modern-day Gjonaj in Kosovo. He is known for writing the book Çeta of the Prophets, also known as the Band of Prophets, in 1685, the first prose written in Gheg Albanian. In 1689 he led an uprising against the Ottomans with help from the Holy League. The uprising spread across Kosovo, leading to the capture of Prizren and Pristina. With his works, Bogdani strove to create an understanding of existence, God, science, theology, philosophy, geography, physics, astronomy, and history. He died in 1689 in Pristina.

=== Frang Bardhi ===
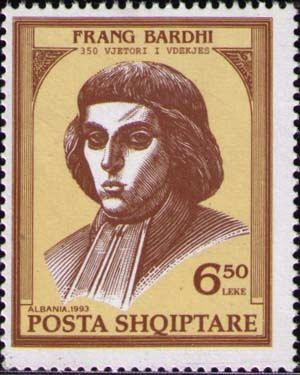
Frang Bardhi on a stamp.

Frang Bardhi (1606–1643) was a Catholic bishop and scholar from Nënshat. He came from a family of Albanians linked to the Catholic church and military generals in Venice. He completed his theology studies in Italy before being appointed as the Bishop of Sapë on 17 December 1635. Bardhi is known for writing the Latin-Albanian Dictionary (Dictionarium latino-epiroticum) the same year, which consisted of 5,640 entries with its appendix containing 113 proverbs, phrases, and idioms, including some from Albanian folklore. Another acclaimed work of his is the Apology of Scanderbeg in 1638, which was a biography and polemic aimed against the Slavic church priest Ivan Tomko Mrnavić who claimed that Skanderbeg was Albanian. Bardhi also gave political reports on Albanian customs to Italy.

=== Andrea Bogdani ===
Andrea Bogdani (1600–1683) was a scholar and prelate of the Roman Catholic church. He was the uncle of Pjetër Bogdani and was born in Gjonjan. Andrea received his education by Jesuits in the Illyrian College of Loreto before becoming a parish in Pristina. He wrote the first Albanian-Latin grammar book, which is now lost. Bogdani's other works have been criticized by Radovan Samardžić for forgery and revisionism from Serbian medieval history.

=== Llukë Bogdani ===
Llukë Bogdani (died 1687), also known as Luca Bogdano, was a scholar of the Bogdami family and cousin of Pjetër Bogdani. He was one of the first Albanian poets, known for writing the poem Pjetër Bogdanit, argjupeshkëpit Skupsë, kushërinit tim dashunit (To my dear cousin Petro Bogdano, Archbishop of Skopje), an eight-line poem deticated to Pjetër Bogdani, which was published in the early versions of Cuneus Prophetarum (Çeta of the Prophets) in 1685, later removed for being religiously "inappropriate".

=== Gjon Gazuli ===
Gjon Gazuli (1400–1465) also known as Gjin Gazuli or Gjon Gjin Gazuli was a scholar, astronomer, diplomat, and Dominican friar from the Republic of Ragusa of Albanian origin. Gazuli received his education in schools such as the schools of Shkodër and Dubrovnik before graduating for the University of Padua in 1430. He began working as a diplomat for Skanderbeg and the League of Lezhë in 1432, carrying out various diplomatic missions in Hungary. He also served as a diplomat in the courts of Italian principalities, representing the interests of the Albanian resistance. Gazuli was regarded by people in Italy and Hungary as a good scientist with a reputation of "considerable knowledge" and his works, about astronomy and mathematics and physics, contained large amounts of information. His most acclaimed work is "De directionibus" (On Directions)

=== Onufri ===
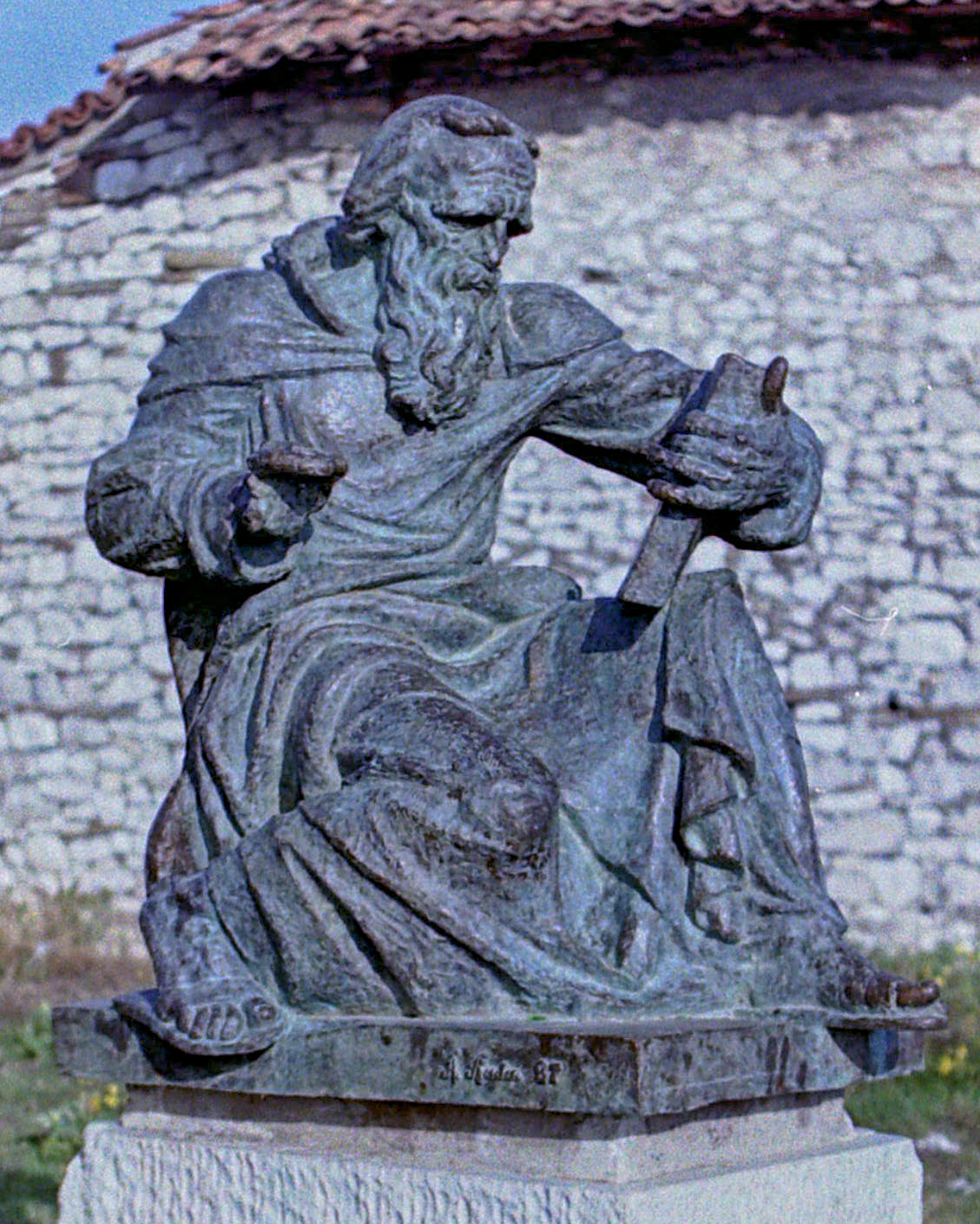
A statue of Onufri in Berat.

Onufri, also known as Onouphrios of Neokastro or Onouphrios Argytes, was an archpriest and iconograph known for his "unique" style of art which had a significant influence on Albanian culture. He was active in Berat and in Venice during 1547; however, from 1555, he began prioritizing Southern Albania, painting in church murals in Berat, Kastoria, the village of Shelcan near Elbasan, the village of Valsh, and the church of St. Nicholas in Prilep. His signature Protopapas, used in all of his works, demonstrated that he had a senior position in the church. Onufri's most notable works include "The Resurrection of Lazarus", "Sts Peter and Paul Fresco" (murals), "Mary and Child" and murals in the church of Berat.

=== Nikolla ===
Nikolla was a famous painter and the son of Onufri. His birth and death date remain unknown. Nikolla's painting were very similar to his fathers, as they both painted mainly in murals. His magnum opus, the mural of the St. Mary of Blachernae Church in Berat, showcases the Roman Emperor Constantine I and his mother Helena of Constantinople finding the Holy cross in Jerusalem. His second most famous work is an icon of the Apostle Saint Peter painted during the second half of the 16th century, held today in the Onufri Museum in Berat.

=== Bernardino Vitali ===
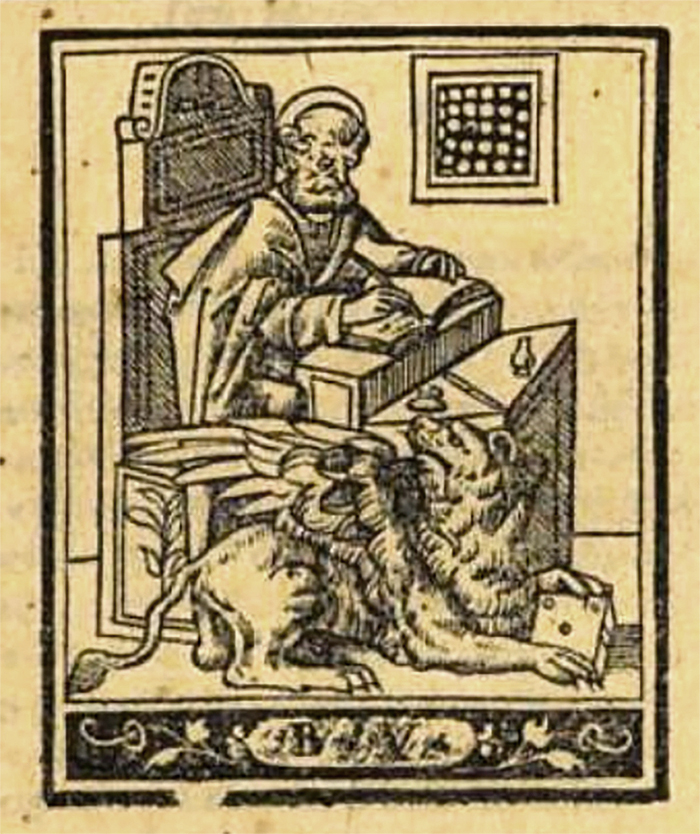
Printers mark of Bernardino Vitalibus "BV". Woodcut from Venetias Poema (1521).

Bernardino Vitali was an Albanian publisher and printer active in Venice from 1494 to 1539. His workshops, also located in other cities like Rome and Rimini, published more than 200 works of Italian and Albanian humanist scholars, playing a crucial role in the development of literature in the Renaissance. He was the editor and publisher of Marin Barleti, and he also published many books by Marin Beçikemi. Another one of his most notable publications was Tabulae Anatomicae by Andreas Vesalius. Vitali also worked with his brother Matteo, who was the co-owner of the Vitali workshop.

=== Marco Basaiti ===
Marco Basaiti (1470 – 1530) was an important Albanian painter of the Renaissance who worked mainly in Venica as a contemporary of Giovanni Bellini and Cima da Conegliano. His works were mainly portraits and religious subjects. Despite training in the quattrocento style, the upbringing of Basaiti's career at the start of the cinquecento style forced him to adapt his style to stay current.

However, several scholars such as Giorgio Vasari consider Marco Basaiti to have been a Greek from Friuli as opposed to an Albanian from Venice.

=== Andrea Alessi ===
Andrea Alessi (1425 – 1504/05) was an Albian born Venetian sculptor and architect. He is considered to be one of the most renowned and distinguished architects in Venetian Dalmatia. Alessi began his career as a disciple of Giorgio da Sebenico. His most acclaimed work, the expansion of the Chapel of St. John of Trogir, was formed with the assistance of Niccolò di Giovanni Fiorentino. Alessi's most famous works are the merchant statues in Ancona.

=== Mesihi of Prishtina ===
Mesihi of Prishtina (1470 – 1512) was one of the earliest Albanian poets, whose works were considered as some of the best in the Ottoman Empire during the period of the Timurid Renaissance. During his youth in Istanbul, Mesihi became a softa, a theological student. He was regarded as the "third great Ottoman poet" and the "greatest lyric poet before Bâkî". Mesihi's poems were written in a plain and easy to understand language, with his manner devoid of affectation.

=== Yahya Bey Dukagjini ===
Yahya Bey Dukagjini (1488–1582) was an Ottoman-Albanian poet of the 16th century and a member of the noble Dukagjini family of Northern Albania. He is considered as one of the greatest diwan poets in the history of Ottoman literature. Yahya's poetry earned him the respect of several important figures in the Ottoman Empire, including Süleyman the Magnificent and Şehzade Mustafa whom he accompanied. Yahya Dukagjini's works included several elements from European Renaissance poetry, including sattire, which he used in a qasida poem against rival poet Khayali in 1536. His other poems involved subjects surrounding the morality and laws life, religion and romance.

=== Suzi Çelebi ===
Suzi Çelebi (1455/56 – 1524) was an Ottoman-Albanian poet and historiographer from Prizren. His epic poem, Gazavatnama Mihaloğlu, was one of the most-known Ottoman poems of the 15th century. Despite being intended as an epic, Gazavatnama Mihaloğlu was infused with florid language, becoming similar to a lyrical poem. The Suzi Çelebi Mosque of Prizren was dedicated to him, being an important Kosovar monument of the 15th century.

=== Luca Matranga ===
Luca Matranga (1569 – 1619) was an Arbëresh writer and Catholic priest of Byzantine rite amongst the Albanian community in Sicily. He is considered as one of the most important Old Albanian authors. E mbsuame e krështerë was the first diaspora work to be written in Albanian. Besides the translation of the Christian Doctrine, the book also included an eight-line poem written by Matranga himself. Luca originated of the noble Mataranga family and lived in Piana degli Albanesi.

=== Architect Kasemi ===
Architect Kasemi (1570 – 1659) was an Ottoman-Albanian architect from Gremsh, Tomorricë and one of the closest assistants of Mimar Sinan. He became Ottoman court architect in 1622, preceding the late Hasan Agha. After the enrichment of his role, Kasemi built several projects in Istanbul and Albania, as well as the roads of Berat and Korçë. This has led to him being considered as a master of classical Ottoman architecture.

=== Sedefkar Mehmed Agha ===
Sedefkar Mehmed Agha (1450 – 1617) was an Ottoman-Albanian architect and disciple of Mimar Sinan, born in either Elbasan or Kalkandelen. He initially specialized with inlay in mother-of-pearl, leading to him receiving the title of Sedefkar. Later he switched to architecture where he would create many important structures in Istanbul, the most notable of which was the Blue Mosque. After giving the Sultan a decorated quiver in 1591, Mehmed would be promoted to Chief Bailiff. The same year he would become Inspector of Works. In 1597 he would be appointed as Master of Waterways. Mehmed Agha would also be commissioned to build a throne for Ahmed I.

=== Gjon Muzaka ===
Gjon Muzaka (died c. 1515) was a historian and member of the noble Muzaka family. He is considered to be one of the earliest Albanian historians, with his work, the Muzaka chronicles, being one of the oldest Albanian substantial texts. The work was published for the first time in Karl Hopf's Chroniques gréco-romaines in 1873.

=== Nikollë Leonik Tomeu ===
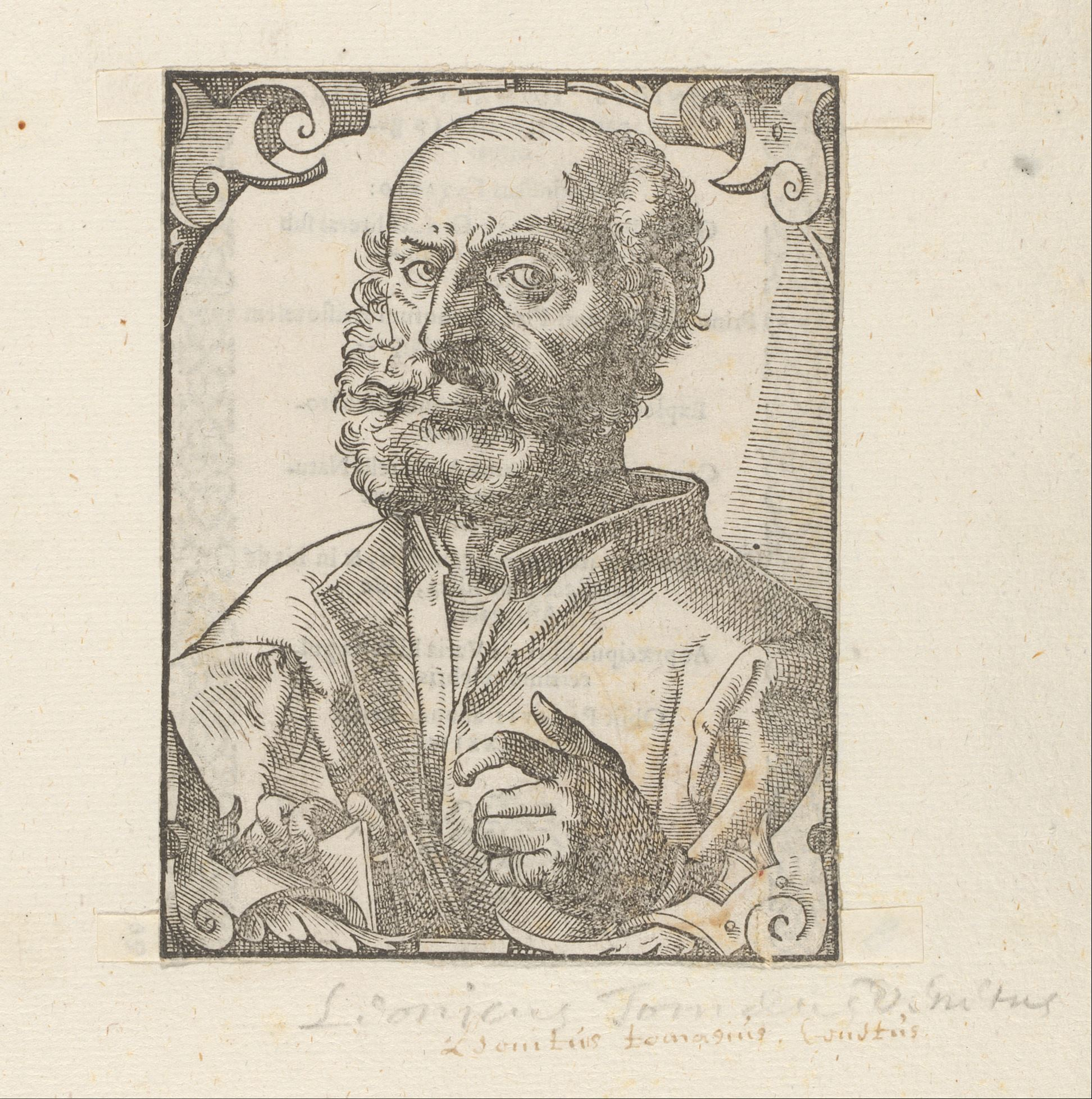
Portrait of Nikollë Leonik Tomeu

Nikollë Leonik Tomeu (1456 – 1531) was an Albanian-Venetian scholar and professor of philosophy, Greek and Latin at the University of Padua. He began his scholarly education in Florence, where he was taught philosophy and literature by Demetrios Chalkokondyles. He was first appointed by the University of Padua in 1497 to lecture on the texts of Aristotle. Tomeu's works were admired by several famous scholars of the Renaissance, including Erasmus. His Opuscula, written in the quarto format and printed by Bernardino Vitali, contains 139 folios which include comments on Aristotle's works about natural science.

=== Onufri Cypriota ===
Onufri Cypriota, (Onouphrios Cypriotes) was a 16th-17th century painter of the Albanian Renaissance. Thought to be from Cyprus, Cypriota moved to Albania sometime after the Ottoman invasion of the island. He began his career as an artist in 1596, with his style having several similarities to western art.

== Sources ==
=== Bibliography ===
- Xhevat, Lloshi (1999). Handbuch der Südosteuropa-Linguistik. Otto Harrassowitz Verlag. ISBN 978-3-447-03939-0.
- Demiraj, Shaban (2006). The Indo-European Languages.
- Janet, Byron (1976). Selection among alternates in language standardization: the case of Albanian. Mouton. ISBN 978-90-279-7542-3.
- Genesin, Monica; Matzinger, Joachim (2021). "4 Old Albanian". Comparison and Gradation in Indo-European. doi:10.1515/9783110641325-004. ISBN 978-3-11-064132-5.
- Elsie, Robert (2005). Albanian literature: a short history (2005 ed.). I.B.Tauris. ISBN 978-1-84511-031-4.
- Bihiku, Koço (1980). A history of Albanian literature. Tirana: 8 Nëntori Publishing House. OCLC 9133663.
- Anamali, Skënder (2002). Historia e popullit shqiptar I, Mesjeta [The history of the Albanian people I, Middle ages]. Toena. ISBN 9789992716229. OCLC 52411919.
- Lucia, Nadin (2012). Albania ritrovata. Recuperi di presenze albanesi nella cultura e nell'arte del Cinquencento veneto. Tirana: Onufri.
- Shuteriqi, Dhimitër (1978). Shkrimet shqipe në vitet 1332-1850 (in Albanian). Rilindja.
- Kristeller, Paul Oskar; Cranz, Ferdinand Edward; Brown, Virginia (1980). Mediaeval and Renaissance Latin Translations and Commentaries. Catholic University of America Press. ISBN 978-0-8132-0547-2.
- Cornis-Pope, Marcel; Neubauer, John (2006). The Literary Cultures of East-Central Europe series: History of the Literary Cultures of East-Central Europe: Junctures and Disjunctures in the 19th and 20th centuries. Comparative history of literatures in European languages (book 20). Vol. II. John Benjamins Publishing Company. ISBN 978-9027234537. OCLC 234173843.
- Setton, Kenneth (1976–1984). The Papacy and the Levant, 1204-1571. Vol. four volumes. American Philosophical Society. p. 73. ISBN 978-0-87169-114-9.
- Gibb, Elias John Wilkinson (1904). Edward Browne (ed.). A History of Ottoman Poetry. Vol. 3. London: Luzac & Co. OCLC 2110073.
- Ćukić, Dragan (1971). Kosova: Monumentet dhe bukuritë [Kosovo: Monuments and attractions] (in Albanian). Lidhja turistike e Kosovës. OCLC 51465527.
- Cavendish, Marshall (2010). World and Its Peoples. Marshall Cavendish. ISBN 9780761479031.
- Masters, Tom (2007). Eastern Europe. Lonely Planet. ISBN 978-1-74104-476-8.
- Fabio Maniago (conte di.); Caterina Furlan (1999). Storia delle belle arti friulane. Fondazione Cassa di Risparmio di Udine e Pordenone.
- Pacini (1976). Problemi di morfosintassi dialettale. Centro di studio per la dialettologia italiana.
- Hudhri, Ferid (2003). Albania Through Art. Onufri. ISBN 978-99927-53-67-5.
- Del Negro, Piero (2001). L'Università di Padova: otto secoli di storia. Signum.
- Siraisi, Nancy G. (1985). "Antonino Poppi, ed. Scienza e filosofia all'Università di Padova nel Quattrocento. (Centro per la storia dell'Università di Padova.) Padua-Trieste: Edizioni Lint". Renaissance Quarterly. 38 (2). doi:10.2307/2861668. ISSN 0034-4338. JSTOR 2861668. S2CID 163214637.
- Wasiutyński, Jeremi (2003). The Solar Mystery. An Inquiry Into the Temporal and the Eternal Background of the Rise of Modern Civilization. Oslo: Solum Forlag. ISBN 978-82-56014071.
- Favaretto, Irene (2002). Arte antica e cultura antiquaria nelle collezioni venete al tempo della Serenissima (Riv. e corr. ed.). Roma: "L'Erma" di Bretschneider. ISBN 8882652238.
- Copenhaver, Brian P.; Schmidt, Charles B. (1992). Renaissance Philosophy. Oxford: Oxford University Press. ISBN 978-0-19-219203-5.
- Parkinson, G.H.R. (2003) [1993]. Routledge History of Philosophy Volume IV: The Renaissance and Seventeenth Century Rationalism. London and New York: Routledge. ISBN 978-0-41-505378-5.
- Ossa-Richardson, Anthony (2013). The Devil's Tabernacle: The Pagan Oracles in Early Modern Thought. Princeton, NJ: Princeton University Press. ISBN 978-1-40-084659-7.
- Titi, Fillipo (1763). Descrizione Delle Architetture, Pitture E Scolture Di Vicenza: Con Alcune Osservazioni. Nabu Press. ISBN 1274305268.
- Meksi, Aleksandër (2016). "The Architecture of Mosques in Albania During the 15h to 19h Centuries [Arnavutluk'taki Cami Mimarisi]". In Muhammet Savaş Kafkasyalı (ed.). Balkanlarda Islam: Miadi Dolmayan Umut [Islam in the Balkans: Unexpired Hope]. TİKA. ISBN 978-605-9642-11-8.
- Cragg, Kenneth (1991). The Arab Christian: A History in the Middle East. Westminster John Knox Press. ISBN 0-664-22182-3.
- Brown, Percy (1942). Indian architecture: (The Islamic period). Taraporevala Sons.
- Zeneli, Fidan; Qerimi, Muhmet (2023). "The development of Albanian art during the Middle Age". Street Art and Urban Creativity. 9 (1): 64–73. doi:10.25765/sauc.v9i1.687.
- Warrander, Gail; Knaus, Verena (2010). Kosovo. Bradt Travel Guides. ISBN 978-1-84162-331-3.
- Zindel, Christian; Lippert, Andreas; Lahi, Bashkim; Kiel, Machiel (2018). Albanien - Ein Archäologie- und Kunstführer von der Steinzeit bis ins 19. Jahrhundert (in German). Wien: Böhlau Verlag. ISBN 9783205207238.
- Newmark, Leonard; Philip Hubbard; Peter R. Prifti (1982). Standard Albanian: a reference grammar for students. Andrew Mellon Foundation. ISBN 9780804711296.
- Barleti, Marin (2012). David Hosaflook (ed.). The Siege of Shkodra: Albania's Courageous Stand Against Ottoman Conquest, 1478. Translated by David Hosaflook. Onufri Publishing House. ISBN 978-99956-87-77-9.
- Noli, Fan Stilian (1924). Storia di Scanderbeg (Giorgio Castriotta) re d'Albania: 1412-1468 (in Italian). Rome: V. Ferri.
- Plasari, Aurel; Nadin, Lucia (2022). Barleti i hershëm sipas një dorëshkrimi të panjohur [The early Barleti - according to an unknown text]. Albanian Academy of Sciences/Onufri. ISBN 978-9928-354-88-4.
- Elsie, Robert (2003). Early Albania: A Reader of Historical Texts, 11th-17th Centuries. Olzheim/Eifel, Germany: Harrassowitz Verlag. ISBN 3-447-04783-6.
- Elsie, Robert (2003). "Albanian Literature - an overview of its history and development". In Peter Jordan; et al. (eds.). Albanien: Geographie - Historische Anthropologie - Geschichte - Kultur - Postkommunistische Transformation. Vienna: Lang.
- Marmullaku, Ramadan (1975). Albania and the Albanians. C. Hurst. ISBN 0-903983-13-3.
- Popa, Theofan (1974). Ikona dhe miniatura mesjetare në Shqipëri. Tirana: 8 Nëntori.
- Dushi, Minir (1999). "Xehetaria e Kosovës gjatë shekujve". Dardania (1).
- Mann, Stuart (1955). Albanian literature: an outline of prose, poetry, and drama. B. Quaritch.
- Tourta, Anastasia; Zias, Nikos; Kourkoutidou-Nikolaidou, Eugenia; Glozhen, Lorenc (2006). Icons from the Orthodox Communities of Albania: Collection of the National Museum of Medieval Art, Korce. Thessaloniki: Museum of Byzantine Culture, Thessaloniki; European Centre tor Byzantine and Post-Byzantine Monuments, Thessaloniki; National Museum of Medieval Art, Korcë. ISBN 960-89061-0-5.
- Gjata, Klodjana; Demaj, Marsela; Çuku, Ronela (2012). "Architecture, identity and phases of construction of the Byzantine church of St. Mary Vllaherna – Berat/Albania" (PDF). researchagte.net.
- Chevallier, Jacques (2014). "La destinée des bois de la Fabrique de 1543" (PDF). Histoire des sciences médicales.
- State University of Tirana, Institute of History and Linguistics (1969). Deuxième Conférence des études albanologiques: à l'occasion du 5e ... Vol. 1.
- Malcolm, Noel (1998). Kosovo: A Short History. Macmillan. ISBN 9780333666128.
- Frashëri, Kristo (2002). Gjergj Kastrioti Skënderbeu: jeta dhe vepra, 1405–1468 (in Albanian). Botimet Toena. ISBN 99927-1-627-4.
- Lacey, Joann (2021). History of Art and Architecture. Vol. II. Sugar Creek Press.
- Myftiu, Genc (2000). Albania, a Patrimony of European Values: A Short Encyclopedia of Albanian History and Cultural Heritage. SEDA. ISBN 1873722761.
- Vasari, Giorgio (1963). The lives of the painters, sculptors, and architects. Dent. OCLC 175078002.
- Usmiani, M. A. (1957). "Marko Marulić". Harvard Slavic Studies. Harvard University Press.
- Houtsma, M.Th. (2006). Biographical Encyclopaedia of Islam. Vol. 3. Cosmo Publications. ISBN 9788130703879. OCLC 67694633.
- Wink, André (1990). Al-hind: The Making of the Indo-islamic World. E.J. Brill. ISBN 9789004092495. OCLC 21761923.
- Kaya, İ. Güven (2006). Divan edebiyatı ve toplum (in Turkish). Donkişot. ISBN 9789756511527. OCLC 171205539.
- Fetvacı, Emine (2013). Picturing History at the Ottoman Court. Indiana University Press. ISBN 9780253006783. OCLC 827722621.
- Elsie, Robert (2004). Historical Dictionary of Kosova. Historical Dictionaries of Europe (1 ed.). Scarecrow Press. ISBN 0-8108-5309-4.
- Mandalà, Matteo (2000). Jeta dhe vepra e Lekë Matrëngës (sipas të dhënave të reja arkivore dhe bibliografike). Tiranë: Studime Filologjike.
- Kiel, Machiel (1990). Ottoman Architecture in Albania, 1385-1912. Islamic art series. Vol. 5. Research Centre for Islamic History, Art and Culture. ISBN 9290633301.
- Geanakoplos, Deno J. (1985). "The Career of the Little-known Renaissance Greek Scholar Nicholas Leonicus Tomaeus and the Ascendancy of Greco-Byzantine Aristotelianism at Padua University (1497)". Byzantina. 13 (1).
- European Centre of Byzantine and Post-Byzantine Monuments (2006). Icons from the Orthodox Communities of Albania. Thessaloniki: European Centre of Byzantine and Post-Byzantine Monuments.

=== Websites ===
- Bulo, Jorgo. "Letërsia Shqiptare – A brief history of Albanian literature – Renaissance". shqiperia.com.
- Fiona H. (17 April 2025). "Humanizmi the Renesanca te Shqiptarët". prezi.com.
- Robert, Elsie. "Pjetër BUDI". Archived from the original on 9 June 2010.
- Prenushi, Mikel. "Meshtari Dhimiter Frangu (Demetrio Franco) (1443 - 1525) Luftëtar dhe historian i Skenderbeut" (in Albanian). Archived from the original on 30 October 2020.
- "Anonimi Tivaras". wiki.shqipopedi.org. 7 October 2018.
- Clough, Cecil H. (1970). "BECICHEMO, Marino".
- Elsie, Robert. "1515 John Musachi: Brief Chronicle on the Descendants of our Musachi Dynasty". www.albanianhistory.net.
- Loka, Nikollë (2017). "The development of education in medieval Albania". academia.edu.
- Pieroni, Andrea; Dibra, Blendi; Grishaj, Gjystina; Grishaj, Ilir; Gjon Maçai, Simon (2005). "Traditional phytotherapy of the Albanians of Lepushe, Northern Albanian Alps". Fitoterapia. 76 (3–4): 379–399. doi:10.1016/j.fitote.2005.03.015. PMID 15890470.
- "Shkollat e para shqipe gjatë mesjetës". shtepiaelibrit.com. 13 March 2015.
- Prolexis enciklopedija (9 June 2016). "Gazuli (Gazulić), Gjin (Ivan, Joannes)".
- Cheney, David M. "Bishop Francesco Bianchi". Catholic-Hierarchy.org.
- Bibloteka Kombëtare e Shqipë¹risë. "Meshari i Gjon Buzukut". bksh.al.
- "Dottrina Christiana – Pjeter Budi". bibliotekashkoder.com. Archived from the original on 2020-07-21.
- Nikolovski, Darko. "Carskite dveri od crkvata Sv. Nikola vo s. Zrze - Prilep ['The Royal Doors from the church of St.Nicholas in Zrze-Prilep']". Archived from the original on 5 October 2013.
- De Marinis, Tammaro (1937). "Bernardino dei Vitali (Enciclopedia Italiana)". treccani.it.
- "Robert Elsie: Albanian Literature in Translation". Archived from the original on 25 September 2009.
- "Luka Mjeda - ANDREA ALESSI". Hrvatski Fotografski Centar.
- Steenson, Allison (22 September 2023). "Leonico Tomeo's Marginalia: Manuscript and Print in Sixteenth-Century Veneto". academic.oup.com.
- "Marco Basaiti". ArtFortune.com. Archived from the original on 5 April 2017.
- Lucco, Mauro (4 April 2017). "Basaiti, Marco". Oxford Art Online, Grove Art Online.
