= Siege of Shkodër =

The siege of Shkodër may refer to:

== Military blockade ==
- The Siege of Scutari (Shkodra) (1410) by forces of the Lordship of Zeta during the First Scutari War (early 1405 — 30 January 1413)
- The Siege of Scutari (Shkodra) (1422-1423) by forces of the Serbian Despotate during the Second Scutari War
- The Siege of Shkodra (1474) by the Ottoman Empire during the Ottoman–Venetian War (1463-1479)
- The Siege of Shkodra (1478-1479) by the Ottoman Empire during the Ottoman–Venetian War (1463-1479)
- The Siege of Scutari (1912-1913) by the Kingdom of Montenegro and the Kingdom of Serbia during the First Balkan War

== Literature ==
- The Siege of Shkodra (book) (Latin: De obsidione Scodrensi), a book written by Shkodran priest Marin Barleti, published in 1504 in Venice by Bernardino da Vitalibus about the sieges of Shkodra in 1474 and 1478-1479
