= Henrik Lacaj =

Albanian humanitarian, linguist, and translator

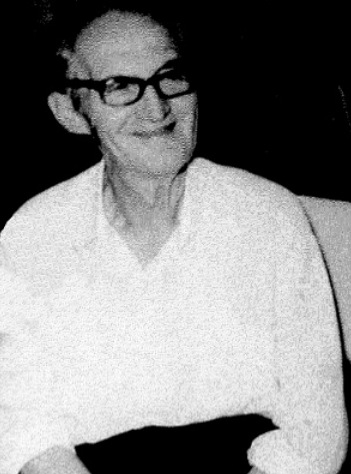
- Born: 11 February 1909; Shkodra, Ottoman Empire (now Albania)
- Died: 12 March 1991 (aged 82); Tirana, Albania
- Education: Saverian College of the Jesuits, University of Padua
- Occupations: Linguist, translator, professor
- Spouse: Zita (Bonati) Lacaj
- Children: Nikolin Lacaj, Nausika Lacaj, Viktor Lacaj
- Relatives: Pashko Gjeci
- Writing career
- Language: Albanian, Latin, Ancient Greek, Italian
- Genres: Classics, Albanian Language, Albanian History
- Notable works: Latin-Albanian Dictionary, The Siege of Shkodra (trans. Latin>Albanian)

Henrik Lacaj (February 11, 1909 – March 12, 1991) was an Albanian humanitarian, linguist, and translator. He authored textbooks, plays, and various studies on historical figures such as Scanderbeg and Luigj Gurakuqi, but in Albania he is most venerated for his numerous translations of Latin and Greek masterpieces.

== Bibliography ==
=== Original works ===
- The Latin-Albanian Dictionary (over 20,000 words; in collaboration with Filip Fishta)
- Dictionary Latin-Albanian (unpublished and in cards)
- Monographs on Pjeter Budi and Dom Ndoc Nikaj.
- Studies on the lives and works of Luigj Gurakuqi and Hilё Mosi.
- An essay on Scanderbeg, in Italian.
- Moisi Golemi of Dibra (drama).
- Ora e Shqypnis [Albanian's Fairy].
- Articles in the magazines Shkёndija, Iliria, and Rilindja.
- A sonnet for independence, 28 Nëndor 1912.
- Notes on the Life and Literary Work of Luigj Gurakuq
- Notes on the Life and Work of Dom Ndoc Nikaj
- Philological Studies: Pjetër Budi, The First Poet of our Literature
- Philological Studies: Scanderbeg in the Italian Literature (1967)
- The History of the Teaching and Pronunciation of the Latin language in Albania. Written in Italian, published by Das Altertum magazine in East Berlin.
- Essay on the Latin language in Albania and its pronunciation.
- Essay on Alexander Sergeyevich Pushkin
- “The expedition of George Kastrioti Skarnderbeg in Puglie” by Gennaro Maria Monti
- “In the Wave of Preparations” (an essay published in 1928 on the 50th Anniversary of Saverian College)

=== Translated works ===
- Aeneid (Virgil) (co-translated with Engjell Sedaj, with an introduction by Myzafer Xhaxhiu)
- Aminta (Torquato Tasso) (with an introduction by Dalan Shapllo)
- Ancient Greek Lyrics: The Anthology of Greek Poetry. Tirana: Naim Frashëri, 1962. 68 p.
- The Birds (Aristophanes)
- The Braggard Soldier (Plautus)
- Bucolica (Virgil)
- De Obsidione Scodrensi (Rrethimi i Shkodrës or The Siege of Shkodra by Marinus Barletius)
- De Rerum Natura (Lucretius)
- Ecloga III
- Elegy (Tristium)
- Epigrams by Catullus (some yet unpublished)
- Epigrams (75) by Martialis (unpublished)
- Excerpts from Dante Alighieri
- Gerusalemme liberata Jerusalem Delivered (Torquato Tasso) (unpublished—translated in octaves with rhyme, like the original)
- The History of Life and Work of Scanderbeg (Marinus Barletius) (co-translated by Stefan Prifti)
- Look Back In Anger (a play by John Osborne)
- The Meeting of Hector and Andromache (excerpt) (Homer)
- Metamorphoses (Ovid) (with an introduction by Dalan Shapllo)
- Oedipus Rex (Sophocles)
- Përse Rrojmë Gjallë [Why Do We Live] (based on the Italian canzonette Perche Si Vive)
- Trëndafila dhe Gjëmba [Roses and Thorns] (Pashko Vasa)—translated by Lacaj into Italian as Rose e Spine
- The Warrior (Luftëtari) (based on the Italian canzonette La Ferrera)
- The Wasps (Aristophanes)
- Other works of classical authors such as Aristophanes, Catullus, Homer, Horace, Martialis, Ovid, Plautus, Propertius, Tibullus, and Virgil.
