= Shkodër Bazaar =

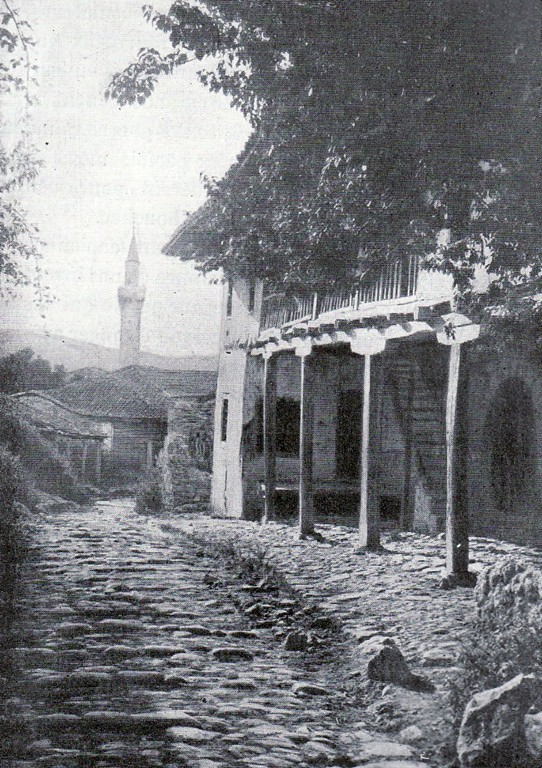
Alley within the Bazaar of Shkodra with a mosque minaret in the background

The Shkodër Bazaar (also known as the Grand Bazaar or the Old Bazaar) was the economic and civic hub of Shkodër, Albania for centuries and was one of the most important trade hubs in the Western Balkans. After the rise of the People's Socialist Republic of Albania in 1944, the bazaar became a camp for refugees from the Orthodox population of Greek-speaking Albanians fleeing the Greek Civil War. In 1968, the bazaar was demolished and replaced with a park.

== Location ==
The Bazaar lay at the foot of Rozafa Castle, about 1 kilometre (0.62 mi) south of the modern city center, on the plain stretching to the bank of the Buna. According to legend, the bazaar dates to before the city fell to the Ottoman Empire and once stretched all the way to the Qafa neighborhood. This is attested to in Marin Barleti’s book on the Siege of Shkodra in 1478-79.

== History ==
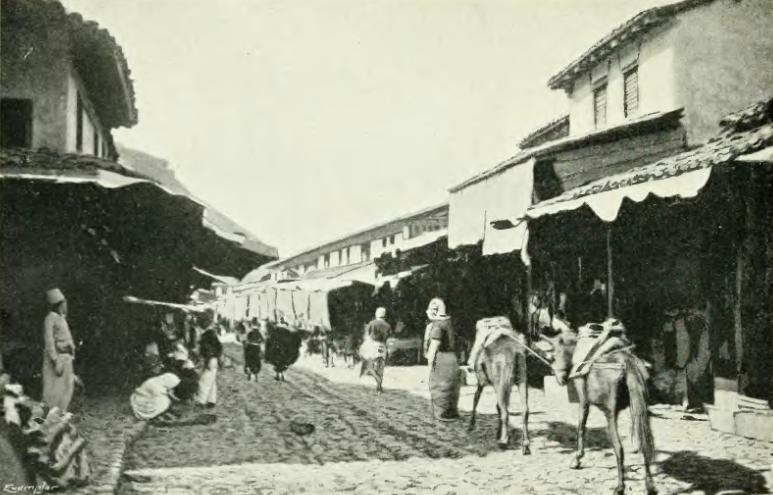
Shkodër Bazaar in 1904

A market was held there from the earliest times. As early as the 14th century, the Statutes of Scutari refer to the area as a favolete (trading post). Originally associated with the river pier and the holdings of the Bushati family, the Bazaar became one of the most famous markets in the Balkans. It continued to play a major role in the craft trade as late as the 1870s, when as many as 2500 merchants were licensed to trade there.

Beginning in the 1860s, the Bazaar began to decline due a variety of factors. These included competition from industrial production, the opening of the Suez Canal in 1869, the construction of the Mitrovica-Thessaloniki Railway, Montenegro’s annexation of Ulcinj and Bar in 1880, flooding, general Ottoman decline, steamships on the Danube, competition from Edirne, and a 1905 earthquake. During the Montenegrin occupation of Albania in the Balkan Wars, departing troops burned the prime wheat and barley shops completely down, damaging 250 stands.

== Decline ==
Major historical factors in the decline of the Bazaar include the following:

1. Damage during World War I
2. Changes in the flow of the Drin that swelled the Bojana up the plain and flooded the most picturesque part of the Bazaar
3. In 1940, road construction from Molo to Bahçallëk cut off the waterfront.
