= Bernardino Vitali =

Albanian printer and publisher

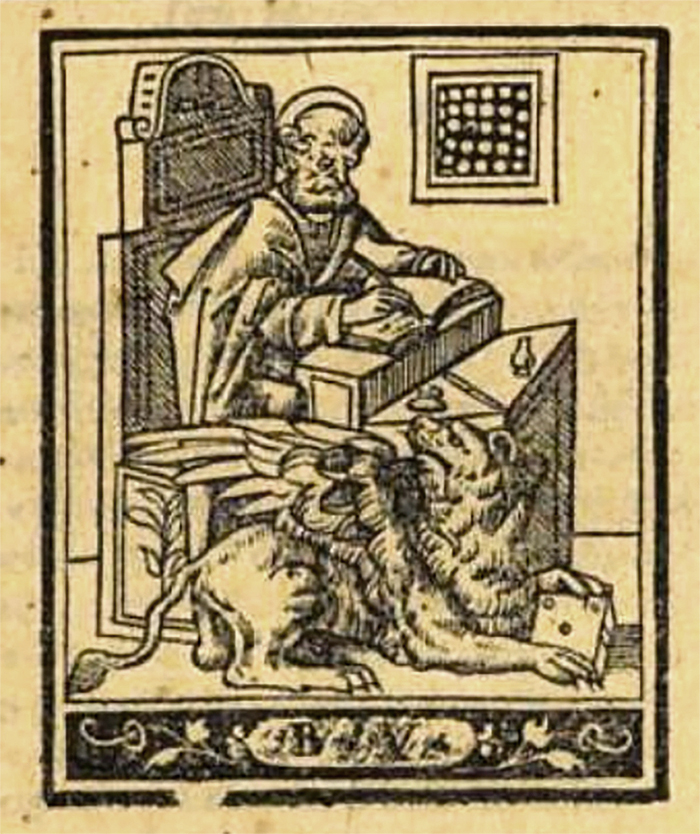
Printers mark of Bernardino Vitalibus (BV). Woodcut from Venetias Poema, 1521.

Bernardino Vitali was an Albanian printer and publisher, active in Venice from 1494 to 1539. His printing workshop published more than 200 works of Venetian humanists in the first half of the 16th century.

== Background and family ==
Vitali was one of the albanesoti, Albanians who had settled in Venice mostly as refugees after the fall of Shkodra (northern Albania) to the Ottomans. The refugees had acquired Venetian citizenship and were integrated in the economic and social life of the republic. A close relative of Bernardino Vitali, Giovanni - possibly his grandson - was a priest and calligrapher from Brescia. He lived in Vitali's house in San Zulian and produced a luxury copy of the code of regulation of the Scuola degli Albanesi in 1552.

== Career ==
Vitali opened his printing workshop in 1494 in Venice with his brother Matteo. The workshop operated until 1539. It was first located in the quarter of Santa Maria Formosa and later in San Zulian. In his career, Vitali published over 200 works in wide ranging subjects. He operated two other printing workshops in Rome and Rimini. His printing signature were the stylized Latin forms of his name: Bernardinus de Vitalibus or Bernardinus Venetus de Vitalibus. One of the first publications of the Vitali brothers was Enneades, an early attempt at writing universal history by Sabellicus. Vitali published many of the works of Albanian humanists who had settled in Italy after the Ottoman conquest of the country. He was the publisher of Marin Beçikemi and Marin Barleti, the first Albanian historian. Vitali was also Barleti's editor. One of the last publications in Vitali's career was Tabulae Anatomicae by Andries van Wesel with illustrations by Jan van Calcar.

== See also ==
- Marin Barleti
- Scuola degli Albanesi
- Siege of Shkodra
- Gregory of Durrës

== Bibliography ==
- Chevallier, Jacques (2014). "La destinée des bois de la Fabrique de 1543" (PDF). Histoire des sciences médicales. XLVIII.
- Nadin, Lucia (2013). Venezia e Albania: una storia di incontri e secolari legami. Regione del Veneto. ISBN 978-88-97784-35-7. Archived from the original on 2022-01-24.
