= Nicholas Leonicus Thomaeus =

Venetian scholar

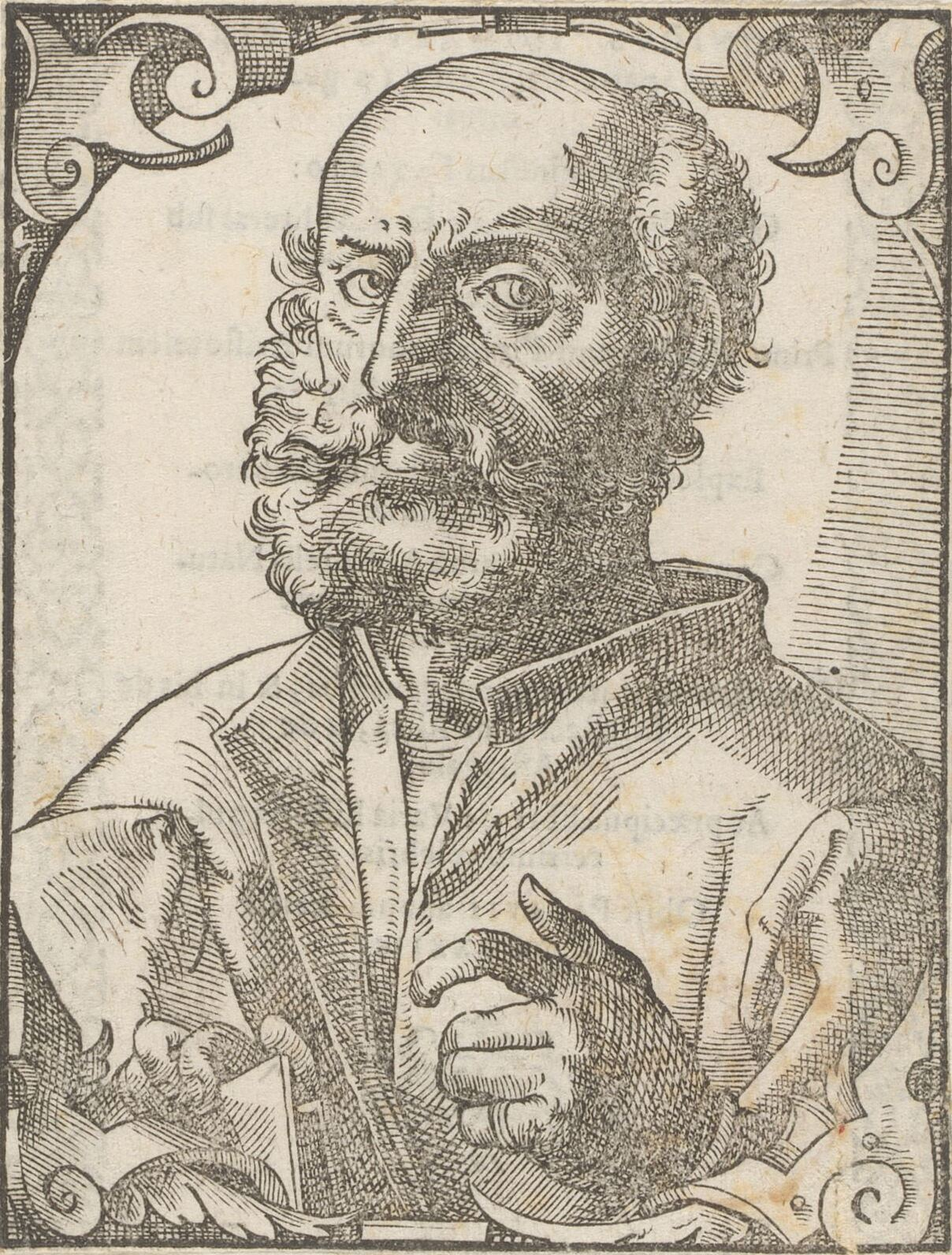
- Engraved portrait of Nicholas Leonicus Thomaeus by Tobias Stimmer
- Born: 1 February 1456; Venice, Italy
- Died: 28 March 1531 (aged 75)
- Occupations: Scholar, professor of philosophy at the University of Padua
- Notable work: Opuscula

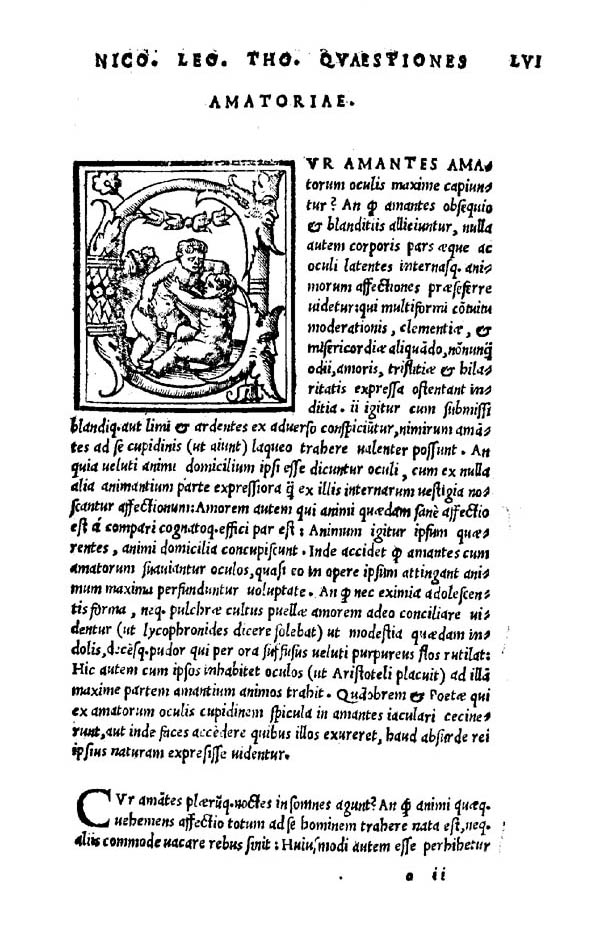
Opuscula by Nicholas L. Thomaeus.

Nicholas Leonicus Thomaeus (Italian: Niccolò Leonico Tomeo, Albanian: Nikollë Leonik Tomeu, Greek: Νικόλαος Λεόνικος Θωμεύς; 1456–1531) was a Venetian scholar and professor of philosophy as well as of Greek and Latin at the University of Padua.

== Biography ==
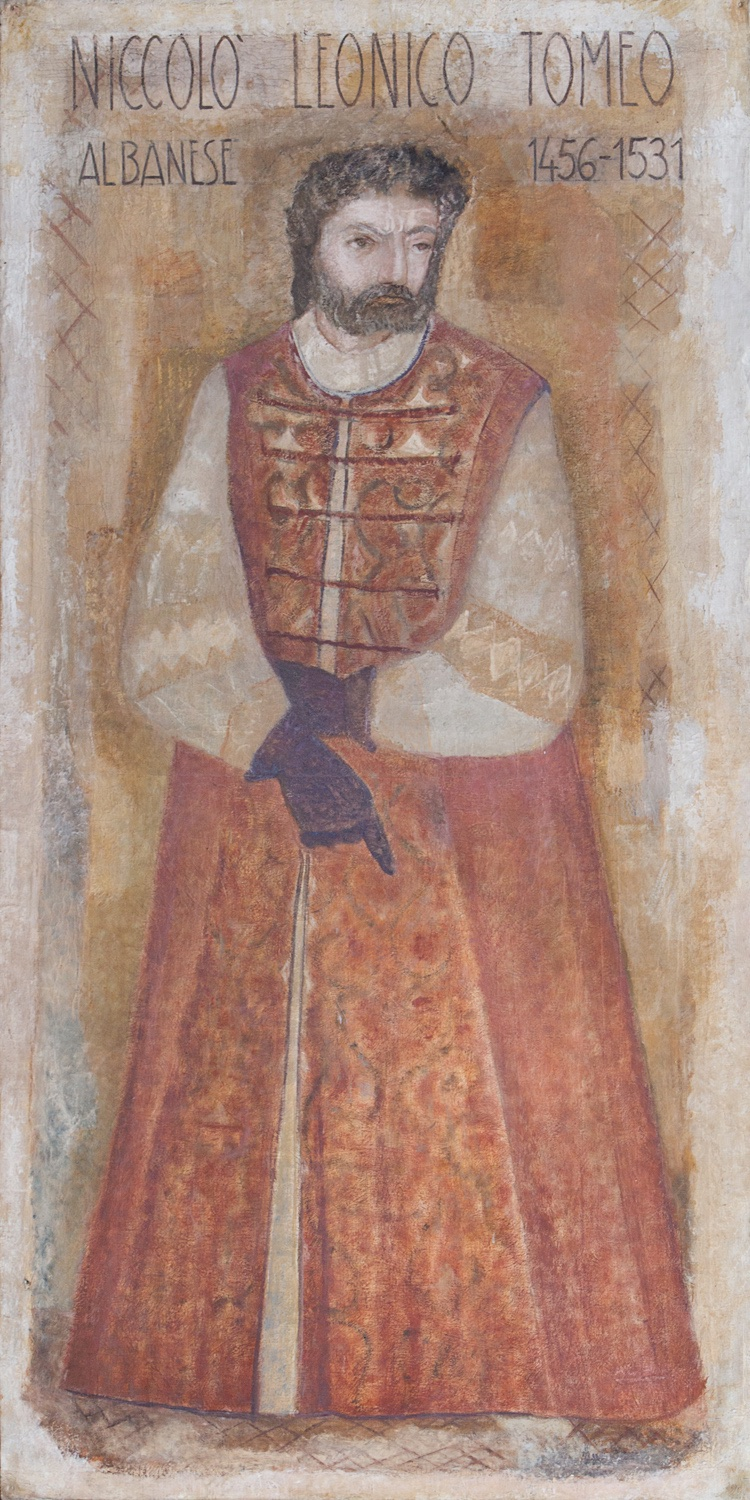
A 1942 standing portrait of Leonicus Thomaeus, depicting him as an Albanian, is found at the L'Aula Magna hall, in Palazzo del Bo.

Thomaeus was born in Venice, Italy on February 1, 1456, to an Albanian or Greek family from Epirus or Albania. While in Florence, he studied Greek philosophy and literature under the tutelage of Demetrios Chalcondyles. In 1497, the University of Padua appointed Thomaeus as its first official lecturer on the Greek text of Aristotle. In 1504, he was elected to succeed Giorgio Valla as chair of Greek in Venice, but because Thomaeus failed to take the post seriously, he was succeeded in 1512 by Marcus Musurus. In 1524, Thomaeus published a collection of philosophical dialogues in Latin, the first of which was titled Trophonius, sive, De divinatione. He was admired by scholars such as Desiderius Erasmus for his philological capabilities. When the University of Padua was reopened after the wars of the League of Cambrai, Thomaeus taught at the university until his death on March 28, 1531.

== Works ==
- Aristotelis Parva quae vocant Naturalia, Bernardino Vitali, Venice 1523.
- Trophonius, sive, De divinatione, 1524.
- Bembo sive de immortalitate animae, 1524.
- Opuscula. Ex Venetiis, Bernardino Vitali, Venice 1525.
- Conversio in Latinum atque explanatio primi libri Aristotelis de partibus animalium… nunc primum ex authoris archetypo in lucem aeditus. G. Farri, Venice 1540.

== See also ==
- Byzantine scholars in Renaissance

== Sources ==
- Bietenholz, Peter G.; Deutscher, Thomas Brian (1995) [1985]. Contemporaries of Erasmus: A Biographical Register of the Renaissance and Reformation (Volumes 1–3). Toronto: University of Toronto Press. ISBN 978-0-80-208577-1.
- Copenhaver, Brian P.; Schmidt, Charles B. (1992). Renaissance Philosophy. Oxford: Oxford University Press. ISBN 978-0-19-219203-5.
- Geanakoplos, Deno J. (1985). "The Career of the Little-known Renaissance Greek Scholar Nicholas Leonicus Tomaeus and the Ascendancy of Greco-Byzantine Aristotelianism at Padua University (1497)". Byzantina. 13 (1): 355–372.
- Ossa-Richardson, Anthony (2013). The Devil's Tabernacle: The Pagan Oracles in Early Modern Thought. Princeton, NJ: Princeton University Press. ISBN 978-1-40-084659-7.
- Parkinson, G.H.R. (2003) [1993]. Routledge History of Philosophy Volume IV: The Renaissance and Seventeenth Century Rationalism. London and New York: Routledge. ISBN 978-0-41-505378-5.
- Runciman, Steven (1985). The Great Church in Captivity: A Study of the Patriarchate of Constantinople from the Eve of the Turkish Conquest to the Greek War of Independence. Cambridge: Cambridge University Press. ISBN 0-521-31310-4.
