= Giammaria Biemmi =

Giammaria Biemmi was an Italian priest who published a work on Skanderbeg titled Istoria di Giorgio Castrioto Scanderbeg-Begh. His work was published in Brescia, Italy in 1742.

His work claimed to be derived from sources older than Marin Barleti's, generally considered the main primary source on Skanderbeg. He made use of contemporary Italian humanists and historians who wrote on Skanderbeg such as Francescus Philephus (1389–1481), Johanes Jovianus Pontanus (1423–1503), Raffaele Maffei Volaterranus (1434–1516), while also using two Byzantine chroniclers, Laonikos Chalkokondyles (1423–1464) and George Sphrantzes (1401–1478). He furthermore made use of archival documents compiled by Odorico Raynaldi (1595–1671) and G. Sagredo (1616–1696).

He also claimed that he had found a work published in Venice in 1480 from which he could not find the name of the author, although he was an Albanian humanist from Bar, in modern-day Montenegro. According to this biographer, his brother was a warrior in Skanderbeg's personal guard. According to Biemmi, the work had lost pages dealing with Skanderbeg's youth, the events from 1443 to 1449, the Siege of Krujë (1467), and Skanderbeg's death. Biemmi referred to the author the work as Antivarino, meaning the man from Bar.

The passages given by Antivarino come out as being more neutral than Barleti's panegyric work. There is no rhetoric and both Skanderbeg's failures and successes are mentioned without leaning towards either side. Using Antivarino as his main work, Biemmi drew harsh criticism against Barleti; however, he criticizes Antivarino on certain points and still agrees with Barleti's major points.

== Antivarino ==
Since Antivarino's work has never been found, polemics over Antivarino's authenticity arose. As a result, most scholars used Barleti's work instead, despite criticisms against it. The first modern historians to use Biemmi were Francesco Tajani and J. E. Pisko, who both regarded Antivarino's work as the earliest one on Skanderbeg. Fan Noli in his first work on Skanderbeg, Historia e Skënderbeut, mbretit të shqiptarëve, holds that Antivarino is an authentic source which Biemmi used. Athanas Gegaj, in his dissertation prepared for the University of Paris, defends Biemmi, saying that he gives us, through Antivarino, valuable information about Albanian society and its princes at the time. Several years later, however, Franz Babinger, in his work dealing with the foundation of Elbasan, asserted that Antivarino never existed. He furthermore stated in Eine Gefälschte Radolt inkunabel that Biemmi aimed to raise interest in his work so he falsified a source. Fan Noli, in his PhD thesis for the University of Boston, George Castroiti Scanderbeg (1405-1468), regards Babinger's conclusions as unconvincing and furthermore argues that the wealth of information could not have been falsified. American historian Kenneth M. Setton states that Noli had not discovered that Biemmi invented the Anonymous of Antivari and that Antvarino was a fraud. He also says that the two "early" chronicles of Brescia were also forged by Biemmi. Noli argues, however, that Luccari, a Ragusan annalist, knew of a History of Scanderbeg by the Archbishop of Durrës who was from Antivari. Rinaldina Russell of Queens College who holds PhD in Italian literature, states that Antivarino's work, provided by Biemmi, is more reliable than Barleti's.

== Notes ==
12. Demetrio Franco : Gli illustri gesti et vittoriose impresse fatte dal Sign. Don Giorgio Castriotto detto Scanderbeg....in Venigia... presso Altobello Salicato, 1584

13. Dhimiter Frangu, Veprat e Lavdishme te Skenderbeut, perktyes, Lek Pervizi, Arberia, Tirane, 2005.
