= The Siege of Shkodra (book) =

The Siege of Shkodra (De obsidione Scodrensi)
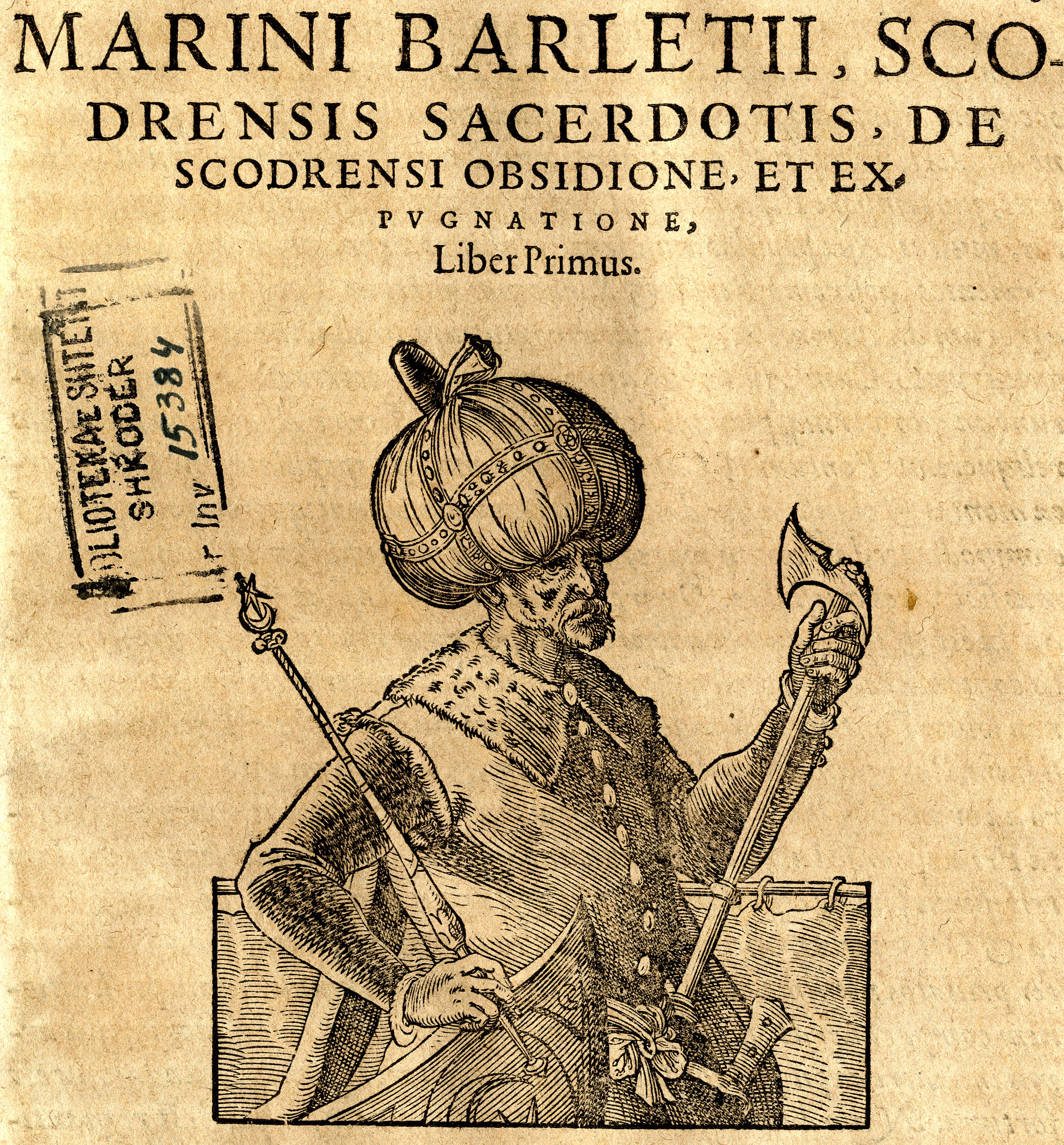
- A page from the 1576 Latin version
- Author: Marin Barleti
- Language: Latin (with translations)
- Subject: The Ottoman siege of Shkodra
- Publisher: Bernardino de Vitalibus
- Publication date: 1504-05
- Publication place: Republic of Venice
- Media type: Print

The Siege of Shkodra is a book written by a Shkodran priest, Marin Barleti (also known as Marinus Barletius), about the Ottoman siege of Shkodra in 1478, led personally by Mehmed II, and about the joint resistance of the Albanians and the Venetians. The book also discusses the Ottoman siege of Shkodra in 1474. The book was originally published in 1504, in Latin, as De obsidione Scodrensi. Barleti was an eyewitness of the events.

== Outline ==
=== Prefatory note ===
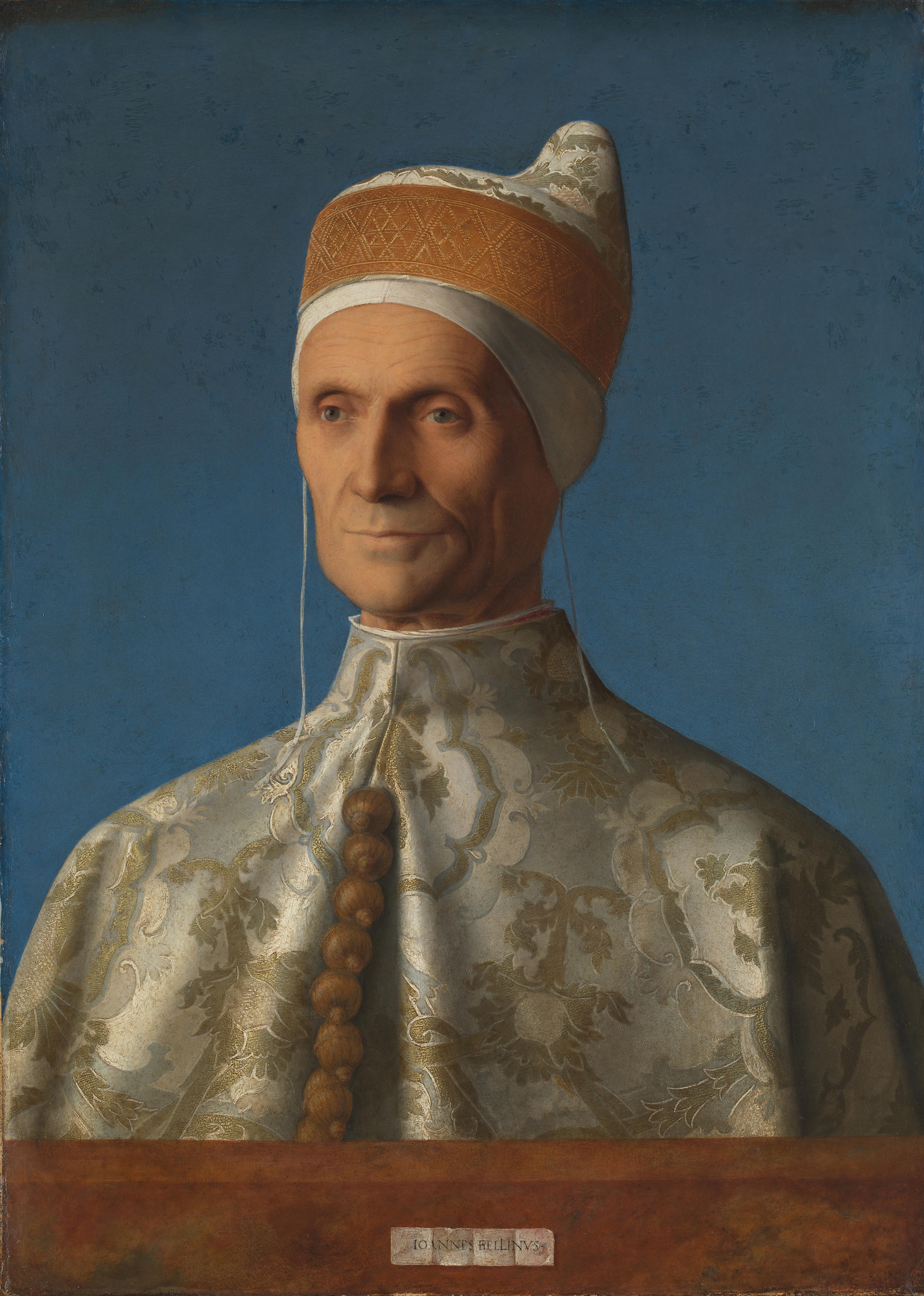
The Doge Leonardo Loredan, addressee of The Siege of Shkodra. Portrait of Doge Leonardo Loredan by Giovanni Bellini (1501)

The work begins with a prefatory note to the doge of Venice, Leonardo Loredan, with Barleti describing his reasons for writing. Then the work is organized into three large chapters called “books.”

=== Book One ===
The first and briefest book gives attention to historical background information about the Turks, the Ottoman sultans, and the city of Shkodra.

=== Book Two ===
The second and largest book describes Mehmedʼs failed efforts to conquer Shkodra in 1474 and continues with a detailed account of his second effort in 1478 (which was ultimately successful despite significant Ottoman losses). In this second book, Barleti describes details of the pre-siege incursions of the akinci, the build-up of Ottoman troops, information about how janissaries were trained, the arrival of camels and chariots with equipment, the production and positioning of artillery around Shkodra’s Rozafa Fortress, the arrival of Sultan Mehmed II in Shkodra, the assault of the cannons (including daily tallies of shots fired), the life and faith of the Shkodran besieged, and five general Ottoman attacks intended to penetrate the breaches in the walls—all of which conclude in failure to conquer the citadel.

=== Book Three ===
The third book describes the sultanʼs decision to halt further attacks upon Shkodra but to attack three smaller citadels aiding Shkodra: Žabljak Crnojevića, Drisht, and Lezha. After describing the successful Ottoman conquest of these cities, the third book records the sultan retreating after ordering a siege force in place in an attempt to starve the Shkodran citizens into surrender. The work concludes with the Shkodran besieged learning of a peace treaty between Venice and Mehmed II, in which Shkodra is ceded to the Ottoman Empire. The citizens are reported to be faced with a choice to either emigrate to Venice or to stay in their city under Ottoman rule. Barleti records all the Shkodrans choosing emigration over subjugation.

== Versions ==
The Siege of Shkodra was first published in Latin (in 1504 and later in 1576) and was translated and published in Italian (1565 with subsequent reprintings), in Polish (at Brest-Litovsk, 1569), and French (at Paris, 1576). In 1962 it was published in Albanian and reprinted in 1967, 1980, 1988, and 2012. In 2012 it was also published for the first time in English.

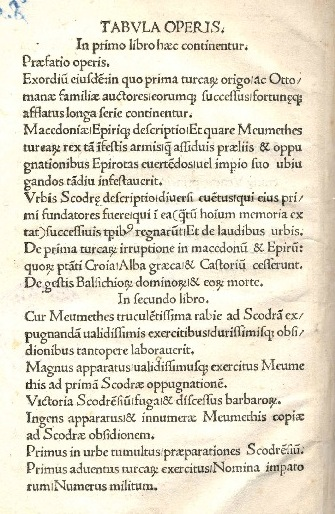
Page from Table of Contents of De obsidione Scodrensi, 1504

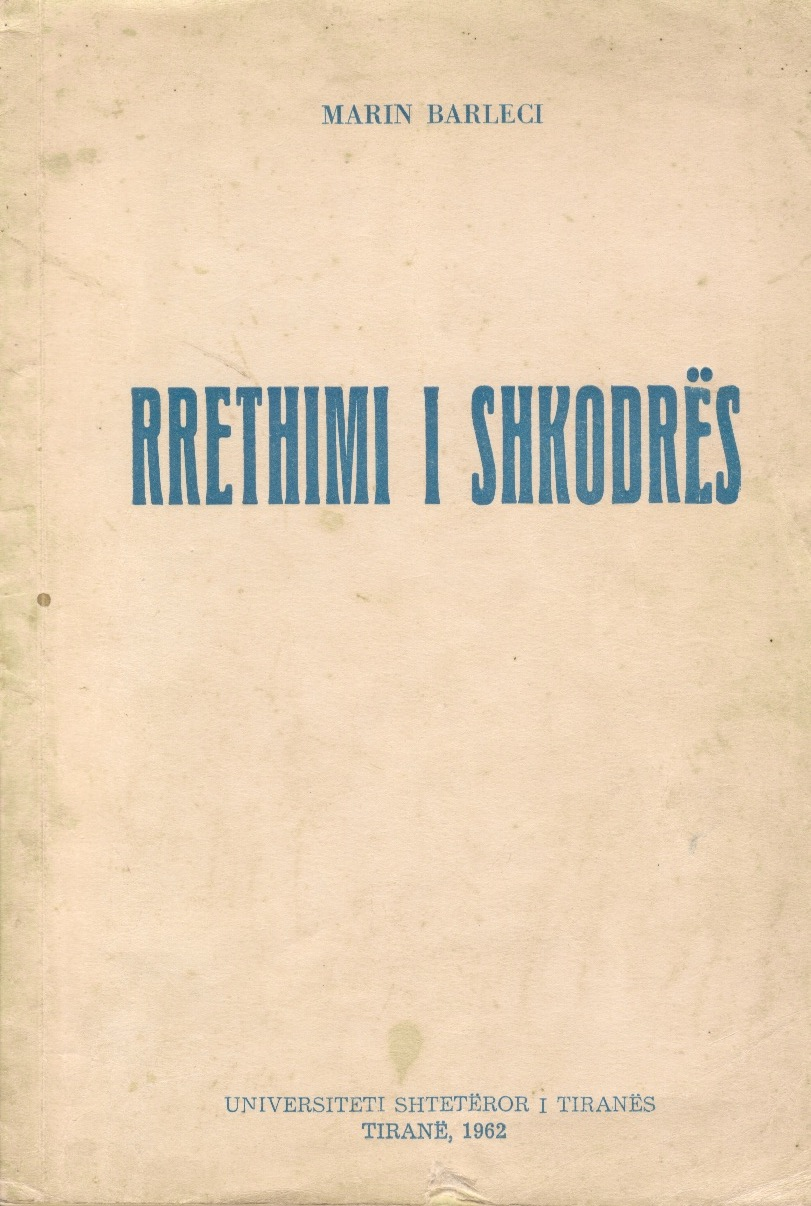
Cover of 1962 Albanian version

=== The Latin Version ===
The first Latin version emerged in 1504, published by the Venetian Bernardino de Vitalibus. It was republished in 1566 in Basel, Switzerland and in 1578 and 1596 in Frankfurt, Germany. In 2018 Venetian scholar Lucia Nadin discovered in Paris a manuscript by Marin Barleti, dated ca. 1500, presumed to be the original manuscript of De obsidione Scodrensi (scholars have begun to study this manuscript) and it was published in 2022.

=== The Albanian Version ===
The Albanian version’s date of publishing coincided with the 50th anniversary of Albania’s declaration of independence from the Ottoman Empire. The work was translated by the Albanian Latin scholar, Henrik Lacaj and included a 20-paged introduction by historian Albanian Alex Buda, the head of the Albanian Academy of Sciences. The Albanian version also included Buda’s scholarly notes (endnotes), George Merula’s essay “The War of Shkodra” (about the siege of 1474), and Marin Beçikemi’s panegyric delivered to the Venetian Senate.

=== The English Version ===
The English version was published in Albania by Onufri Publishing House in 2012, coinciding with the 100th anniversary of Albania’s declaration of independence. The work was translated and edited by David Hosaflook and includes translations of Buda’s introduction and notes, Merula’s “The War of Shkodra,” and Beçikemi’s panegyric. It also includes accounts of the siege of Shkodra from early Ottoman historians, new scholarly notes, the historical context by Prof. David Abulafia, new maps based on the information in the book, and appendixes including Barleti's chronology of battle events.

== Significance ==
Albanian historians such as Alex Buda consider the work "the first Albanian historiographical work" by "the first author in [Albania's] literature." Lucia Nadin asserts claims that the work was well known throughout the centuries in all of Europe. Subsequent historians to the present day who treat the events of the siege of Shkodra frequently reference this work.

== Criticism and Defense ==
The Siege of Shkodra has been criticized by foreign historians who claim that Barleti exaggerated his reports of the numbers of Ottoman soldiers and camels employed and that he invented speeches by the sultan and the sultan’s commanders. Franz Babinger asserts that “this account has long been regarded as untrustworthy because of its bias and the high-flown speeches which, in the classical manner, it puts into the mouths of protagonists who could never have spoken in such a way. It deals at great length with the nature and employment of Ottoman siege machines, providing information that can be appraised only by experts in the history of weapons”. Alex Buda’s introduction to the 1962 Albanian version acknowledges as valid some of the criticisms made by foreign scholars; on the other hand, he explains that flowery language was the style of classical literature in Barleti's day, argues that not all criticism is valid, and argues why Barleti must be consulted as a reputable source (with certain caveats), noting the contemporaneous Ottoman and Venetian historians whose accounts are strikingly supportive of Barleti’s.
