= Marin Beçikemi =

Albanian philosopher

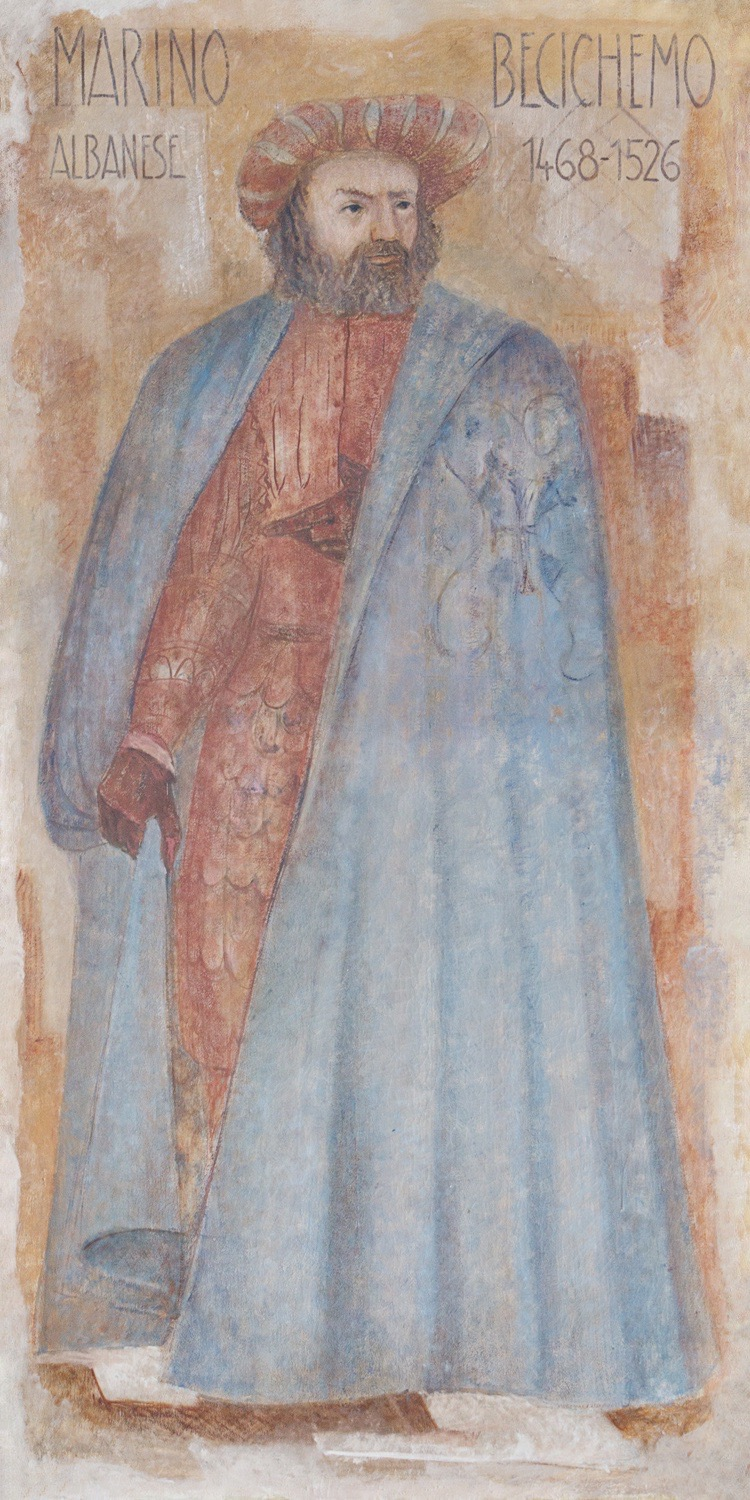
A 1942 standing portrait of Marin Beçikemi at the L'Aula Magna hall, in Palazzo del Bo.

Marino Becichemo or Marin Beçikemi (c. 1468 – 1526) was an Albanian scholar and orator who was a prominent humanist in the cities of Brescia and later Padua in the Republic of Venice in the early 16th century. He maintained a humanist school and was a professor in the University of Padua. He wrote commentaries about classical Latin literature and was well known for his orations in the region of Venice.

== Early life ==
Beçikemi came from an Albanian family in Scutari (Shkodër), then part of the Venetian possessions in Albania. He was probably born in 1468. Many of the biographical details about his family come from several orations and letters he wrote including a panegyric which he wrote in 1503 and directed to the Venetian senate as a laudation for the resettlement of 2,000 Albanian refugees from Shkodra in Italy after the fall of the city to the Ottomans. His grandfather Pietro was, together with Stefano Ionina, an Albanian ambassador serving in Venice. His grandfather and his brother's grandfather had died in the defense of Drisht against Stefan Balšić (1429) His father, Marino, was a secretary of the Republic of Venice at the Ottoman court for about thirty years. The only information about his mother comes from Apostolo Zeno who writes that she was Bianca Pagnano, daughter of Guglielmo Pagnano who hailed from a Milanese merchant family active in Venetian Dalmatia. Beçikemi's father, his brothers, his uncle Stefan and many other relatives fought in the siege of Shkodra in 1478–79. In 1477, he had been sent to nearby Dulcigno just before the beginning of the siege. In total, 26 members out of 30 of his family died in the siege of Shkodra – including his father. Beçikemi, who was eleven at the time, was sent to Brescia to study. The events of the siege of Shkodra were of great significance to Beçikemi who often recalled them and referred to his community even many years after they had settled in Italy as noi miseri profughi albanesi ("we, the miserable Albanian refugees") and called himself infelice profugo (an unhappy refugee).

== Career ==
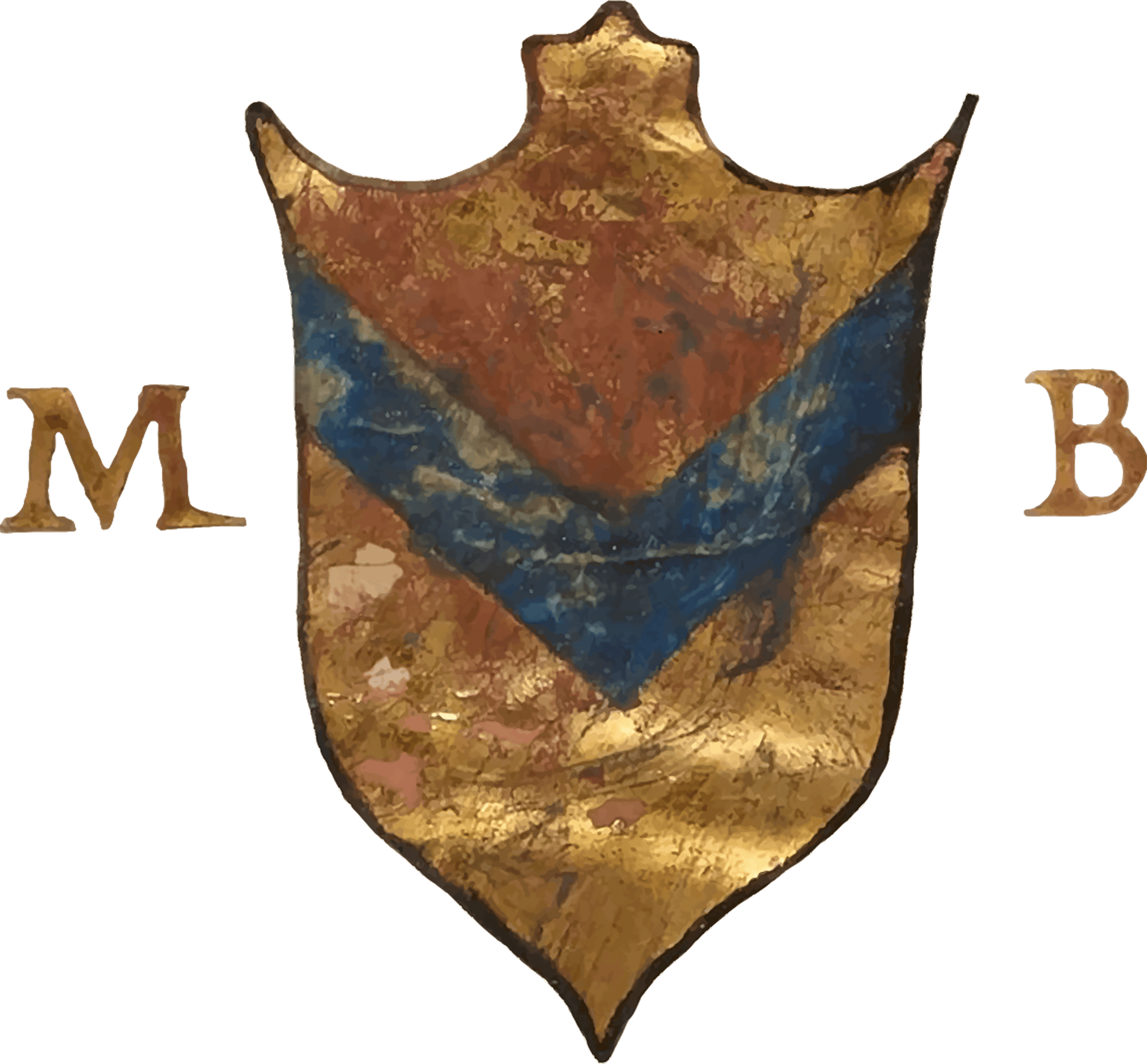
Coat of arms of Marin Beçikemi.

In Brescia, Beçikemi studied Latin and Ancient Greek. In 1484, at only 17 years of age, he held a speech in the city in honour of mayor Marco Antonio Morosini. At that time, he returned to Dulcigno where he married Caterina, the daughter of the local nobleman Pasquale Dabri whose mother belonged to the Bruti family. From this point onwards began Beçikemi academic career. Between 1492 and 1496 he taught at the grammar school of the Republic of Ragusa. His commentary on classical Latin authors Castigationes et observationes in Virgilium, Ovidium, Ciceronem, Servium et Priscianum was published during this time, in 1495, and was dedicated to the Ragusan Senate. In Ragusa he befriended humanist and poet Ivan Gučetić (1451–1502). He was since October 1496 the secretary of Venetian patrician Melchiorre Trevisan, when the latter was provvedittore of the Venetian fleet based in the lands of Ferdinand II of Naples, and later provvedittore generale in the areas which passed from the Duchy of Milan to Venice in 1499. In Brescia, Beçikemi tutored the son of Girolamo Donato (1495–1497).

In 1500, Beçikemi received Venetian citizenship and opened his personal humanist school. In 1501, he lectured in the university of Brescia and in 1503 he became chairman of the city's municipal school. In Brescia, his first works in Latin were published, such as Observationum collectanea in primum Historiae naturali librum (1504–1506). In 1503 he published a panegyric to the Venetian Senate concerning the relief of the refugees after the siege of Shkodra. He wrote commentaries on Cicero, Pliny the Elder and other classical philosophers. At the University of Padua he taught rhetoric.

In 1962 Beçikemi's panegyric of 1503 was translated into Albanian and English and included with Marin Barleti's work, The Siege of Shkodra.

== Published works ==
- Castigationes ad Apuleium, Victorinum et Ciceronis opus de Oratore etc. necnon praeceptiones de componenda epistola, funebrique et nuptiali oratione (1495)
- Praelectio in C Plinium … (1503)
- Panegyricus serenissimo principi Leonardo Lauretano (1504)
- Variarum observationum Collectanea (27 August 1504)
- Observationum collectanea in primum Historiae naturali librum (1504–1506)

== Notes ==
His name is spelt in Italian: Marin Becichemo, Marino Becichemi da Scutari, Albanian: Marin Beçikemi, Serbo-Croatian: Marin Bečić/Марин Бечић. His surname is also spelt Becicco, Bezicco, Bicichemo, Becichio.

== Bibliography ==
- Barleti, Marin (2012). The Siege of Shkodra: Albania's Courageous Stand Against Ottoman Conquest, 1478. Translated by David Hosaflook. Onufri. ISBN 978-9995687779.
- Bietenholz, Pieter; Deutscher, Thomas Brian, eds. (2003). Contemporaries of Erasmus: A Biographical Register of the Renaissance and Reformation, Volumes 1–3. University of Toronto Press. ISBN 0802085776.
- Clough, Cecil H. (1965). "BECICHEMO, Marino". Dizionario Biografico degli Italiani (in Italian). Vol. 7: Bartolucci–Bellotto. Rome: Institute of the Italian Encyclopaedia. ISBN 978-88-12-00032-6.
- Gianna Pomata (2005). Historia: Empiricism and Erudition in Early Modern Europe. MIT Press. pp. 109, 138. ISBN 978-0-262-16229-6.
- John Monfasani (1994). Language and Learning in Renaissance Italy: Selected Articles. Ashgate Publishing Company. p. 176. ISBN 978-0-86078-403-6.
- Nadin, Lucia (2008). Migrazioni e integrazione: il caso degli Albanesi a Venezia (1479-1552). Bulzoni. ISBN 978-8878703407.
- Signaroli, Simone (2009). Maestri e tipografi a Brescia, 1471-1519: l'impresa editoriale dei britannici fra istituzioni civili e cultura umanistica nell'occidente della Serenissima. Edizioni Torre d'Ercole. ISBN 978-88-96755-00-6.
- Malcolm, Noel (2015). Agents of Empire: Knights, Corsairs, Jesuits and Spies in the Sixteenth-century Mediterranean World. Oxford University Press. ISBN 978-0-19-026278-5.
- Downey, Kristin (2014). Isabella: The Warrior Queen. Knopf Doubleday Publishing Group. ISBN 978-0-385-53412-3.
- Preto, Paolo (2010). I servizi segreti di Venezia. Spionaggio e controspionaggio ai tempi della Serenissima. Il Saggiatore. ISBN 978-88-565-0164-3.
