= Marin Barleti =

Albanian historian, priest and humanist (died 1512)

Marin Barleti Marinus Barletius
- Born: c. 145–1454; Scutari, Venetian Albania (present-day Shkodër, Albania)
- Died: c. 1512 (age 57–62); Padua, Republic of Venice (present-day Italy)
- Known for: Author of Historia de vita et gestis Scanderbegi Epirotarum principis
- Scientific career
- Workplaces: Church of St. Stephan

Marin Barleti (Latin: Marinus Barletius, Italian: Marino Barlezio; c. 1450–1454 – c. 1512) was a historian, humanist and Roman Catholic priest from Shkodër. He is considered the first Albanian historian because of his 1504 eyewitness account of the 1478 siege of Shkodra. Barleti is better known for his second work, a biography on Skanderbeg, translated into many languages in the 16th to the 20th centuries.

== Life ==
Barleti was born and raised in Scutari (modern Shkodra, Albania), then part of the Republic of Venice. Although there is no debate whether Barleti was a native Shkodran or an Albanian in a geographical sense, and although there is indirect evidence that he considered his mother tongue to be Albanian, alternatively to an Albanian ethnic origin (supported by Zeno, Fallmerayer, Jireček), some scholars have hypothesized an Italian (DuCange, Iorga), or Dalmatian (Giovio, Czwittinger, Fabricius) ethnic origin. In his works Barleti repeatedly calls himself Shkodran (Latin: Scodrensis), and then equates being Shkodran with being Epirote, a term used by early Albanian language authors as an equivalent form of the ethnonym "Albanian". In an early version of the Siege of Shkodra which was found in 2018 and published in 2022, Barleti recalls that the local language which in another part he equates with Albanian is the language of his ancestors (attavorum nostrum). This is an indirect reference to Albanian being Barleti's mother tongue.

According to linguist Eqrem Çabej, Barleti's surname can be derived from the original form Bardheci, from Albanian bardhë meaning 'white', with the suffix -eci, through the typical fluctuation between [ł] <ll> and ð <dh> that occurs in the dialect of North Geg Albanian, spoken around Shkodra, hence producing the form Barl(l)eci.

In 1474, the Ottoman Empire besieged Shkodra and Barleti participated in the successful defense of the town, both in the first siege in 1474 and the second in 1478. When Shkodra finally fell to the Ottomans in 1479, Barleti escaped to Italy where he would become a scholar of history, classical literature and the Latin language.

Soon after Barleti arrived in Venice, he was given a stall at the Rialto meat market as a temporary means of financial aid. In 1494 became a priest after his theological studies in Venice and Padova, and soon was appointed to serve at St. Stephen's Church in Piovene.

== Works ==
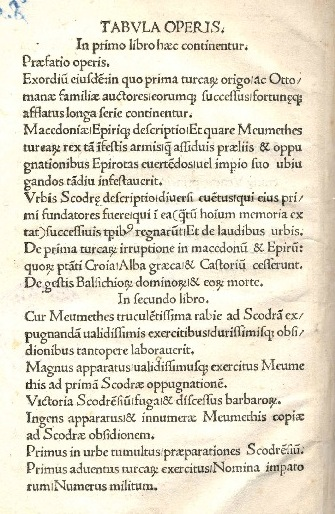
A page from De obsidione Scodrensi (1504)

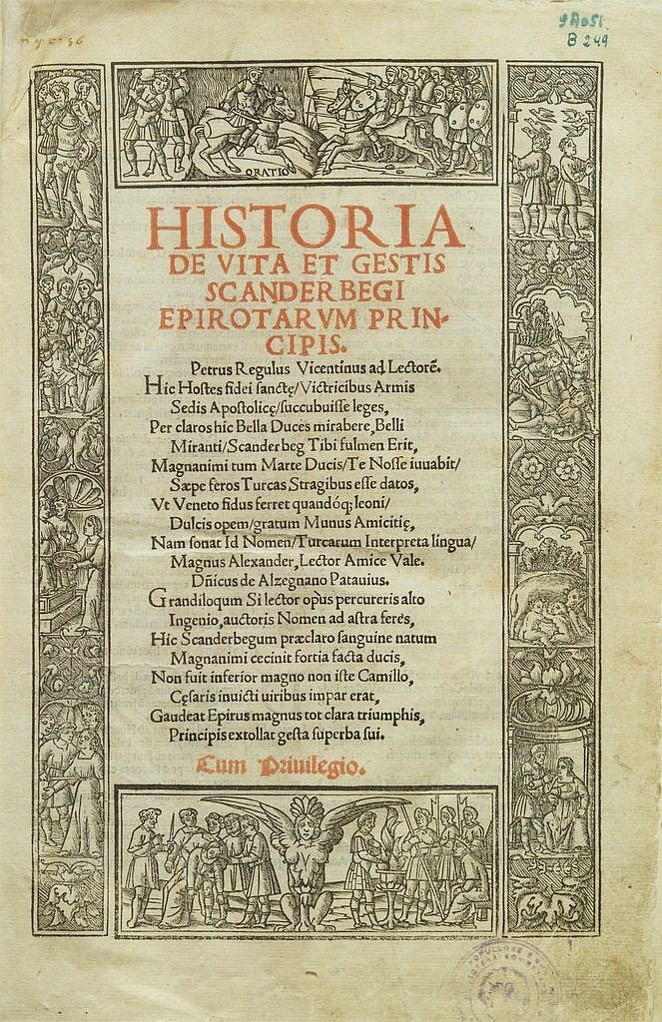
A page from Historia de vita et gestis Scanderbegi Epirotarum principis

=== The Siege of Shkodra ===
Barleti's first work was The Siege of Shkodra (Latin: De obsidione Scodrensi, Venice, 1504). It was published several times in Latin and translated into Italian, Polish, French, Albanian, and English. Barleti wrote this work as an eyewitness. Of this work, acclaimed Albanian author Ismail Kadare wrote that "if one were to search for a literary creation wholly worthy of the expression 'monumental work,' it would be hard to find a better example than The Siege of Shkodra." An early version of the final work was found in 2018 and published in 2022.

=== The History of Scanderbeg ===
Barleti's second and largest work was The history of the life and deeds of Scanderbeg, the Prince of Epirus, (Latin: Historia de vita et gestis Scanderbegi Epirotarvm principis) was published in 1504 in Venice, and later in Rome between 1508 and 1510; (2nd ed.: Strasbourg, 1537; 3rd ed.: Frankfurt am Main, 1578; 4th ed.: Zagreb, 1743) and translated into German (1533), Italian (1554), Portuguese (1567), Polish (1569), French (1576), Spanish (1588), and English (1596). Unlike The Siege of Shkodra, Barleti relied on the testimonies of others to produce this work. Barleti's books were published and printed by Bernardino Vitali in Venice and Rome.

The History of Scanderbeg is considered an Albanian cultural treasure, vital to the formation of Albanian national self-consciousness. A translation of this work of Barleti is in slavonic, in the Cetinje chronicle. A note at the end of this manuscript says, according to Martinovic (1962) that the author of the text is "Marin from Shkodër of Slavic origin".

Paolo Giovio was the first historian to confound Barletius with another contemporary Marinus Scodrensis, Marino Becichemi (1468-1526), professor of rhetorics and author of commentaries on classic literature. The confusion has been elucidated by Thomas Reinesius and Apostolo Zeno. While Barletius in his works calls himself "sacerdotis Scodrensis" (priest of Scodra), Becichemi professes himself married and a "father of boys", professor of Ragusa, Brescia, and Padua, neither of which applies to Barletius.

=== A Brief History of Lives of Popes and Emperors (disputed) ===
Barleti's third work is titled, A Brief History of Lives of Popes and Emperors (Latin: Compendium vitarum pontificum et imperatorum, Venice, 1555).

== Criticism ==
Barletius' work has inspired chroniclers like Giammaria Biemmi and Theodore Spandounes. It is still popular among romanticist and nationalist historians. Modern historical research on Skenderbeg relies more on archival records than on Barletius. Some Albanian historians of the younger generation have suggested that Barleti's opus should be analysed as a discourse rather than as fact-based history. Among others, Albert Bikaj, drawing on Caspar Hirschi’s theory of Renaissance nationalism, considers Barleti's discourse “national” in the Early Modern sense, thereby shaping the earliest form of the Albanian national idea. Bikaj's thesis has been endorsed by the eminent Albanian Medievalist Jahja Drançolli.

Barleti invented spurious correspondence between Vladislav II of Wallachia and Skanderbeg, wrongly assigning it to the year 1443 instead to the year of 1444. Barleti also invented correspondence between Scanderbeg and Sultan Mehmed II to match his interpretations of events.

== Legacy ==
The main public library of Shkodra and a publishing house have been named after Marin Barleti. Also, a university in Tirana, Albania has been established under his name.

== See also ==
- Albanian literature
- Culture of Albania
- Bernardino Vitali
- Siege of Shkodra

== Sources ==
- Martinović, Niko S. (1962), Cetinjski ljetopis [Cetinje chronicle] (in Serbian), Cetinje: Izd. Centr. nar. biblioteke NR Crne Gore, OCLC 7185102, archived from the original on 4 November 2013
- Plasari, Aurel; Nadin, Lucia (2022). Barleti i hershëm sipas një dorëshkrimi të panjohur [The early Barleti - according to an unknown text]. Albanian Academy of Sciences/Onufri. ISBN 978-9928-354-88-4.
