= Andrea Bogdani =

Ottoman scholar of Albanian origin and prelate (ca. 1600-1683)

- Born: ca. 1600; Gur in Hasit, Ottoman Empire (modern-day Kosovo)
- Died: 1683
- Occupation: Catholic priest
- Relatives: Pjetër Bogdani (Nephew)
- Family: Bogdani

Andrea Bogdani (Albanian: Andrea Bogdani; ca. 1600–1683) was an Ottoman scholar of Albanian origin and prelate of the Roman Catholic Church.

== Life ==
Andrea Bogdani was born at the beginning of the 17th century, in Gur i Hasit, near Prizren, Ottoman Empire (modern-day Kosovo). Bogdani was educated by Jesuits at the Illyrian College in Loreto.

After completing his education in Loreto, he became a parish in Pristina. From 1656 to 1677, when he resigned he served as Archbishop of Skopje, while from 1675 to 1677 he also served as apostolic administrator of Achrida. On 8 November 1677 Bogdano resigned because of illness. His nephew Petro Bogdano, one of the best-known writers of early Albanian literature succeeded him as Archbishop of Skopje in 1677. Andrea Bogdano has become known for writing the first Latin-Albanian grammar book, now lost.

Serbian historian Samardžić criticized Bogdani's works as forgery and revisionism of the Serbian medieval history. Bogdani distinguished himself as great enemy of Serbs. He considered Orthodox Serbs as enemies of Catholics and wrote that the Orthodox Serbs in Kosovo, while also being protected by the Ottomans, were trying to extract money from the Catholics.

== See also ==
- Albanian literature
- Culture of Albania
- Luca Bogdano
