= Cuneus Prophetarum =

1685 treatise by Pjetër Bogdani

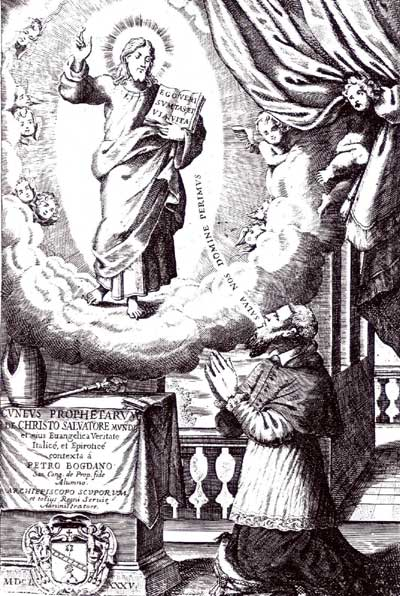
- Front Cover of first edition of Cuneus Prophetarum in 1685 showing Pjetër Bogdani at prayer.
- Author: Pjetër Bogdani
- Original title: Cuneus prophetarum de Christo salvatore mundi et eius evangelica veritate, italice et epirotice contexta, et in duas partes diuisa a Petro Bogdano Macedone, Sacr. Congr. de Prop. Fide alumno, Philosophiae & Sacrae Theologiae Doctore, olim Episcopo Scodrensi & Administratore Antibarensi, nunc vero Archiepiscopo Scuporum ac totius regni Serviae Administratore.
- Language: Albanian and Italian
- Publication date: 1685
- Pages: 436
- LC Class: BS1198 .B6316

Cuneus Prophetarum (Albanian: Çeta e profetëve, English: The Band of the Prophets) is a philosophical, theological and scientific treatise written by Pjetër Bogdani, an Albanian philosopher, originally published in Padua in 1685 in Albanian and Latin. It is considered to be the most prominent work of early Albanian literature.

== History ==
Pjetër Bogdani had finished writing Cuneus Prophetarum by 1675 but was refused the rights to publish it by the Sacred Congregation for the Propagation of the Faith that ordered its translation to allow the book's publication. After ten years the book was published with the assistance of Gregorio Barbarigo, cardinal of Padua in 1685 in Padua, Northern Italy.

The original Latin title of the treatise is: Cuneus prophetarum de Christo salvatore mundi et eius evangelica veritate, italice et epirotice contexta, et in duas partes diuisa a Petro Bogdano Macedone, Sacr. Congr. de Prop. Fide alumno, Philosophiae & Sacrae Theologiae Doctore, olim Episcopo Scodrensi & Administratore Antibarensi, nunc vero Archiepiscopo Scuporum ac totius regni Serviae Administratore.

The English translation of the title is The Band of the Prophets Concerning Christ, Saviour of the World and his Gospel Truth, edited in Italian and Epirotic (Albanian) and divided into two parts by Pjetër Bogdani of Macedonia, student of the Holy Congregation of the Propaganda Fide, doctor of philosophy and holy theology, formerly Bishop of Shkodra and Administrator of Antivari and now Archbishop of Skopje and Administrator of all the Kingdom of Serbia.

The treatise was reprinted, in Italian and Albanian, in 1691 and 1702 by the House of Albizzi as L' infallibile verità della cattolica fede (English: The infallible truth of the Catholic faith)

== Content ==
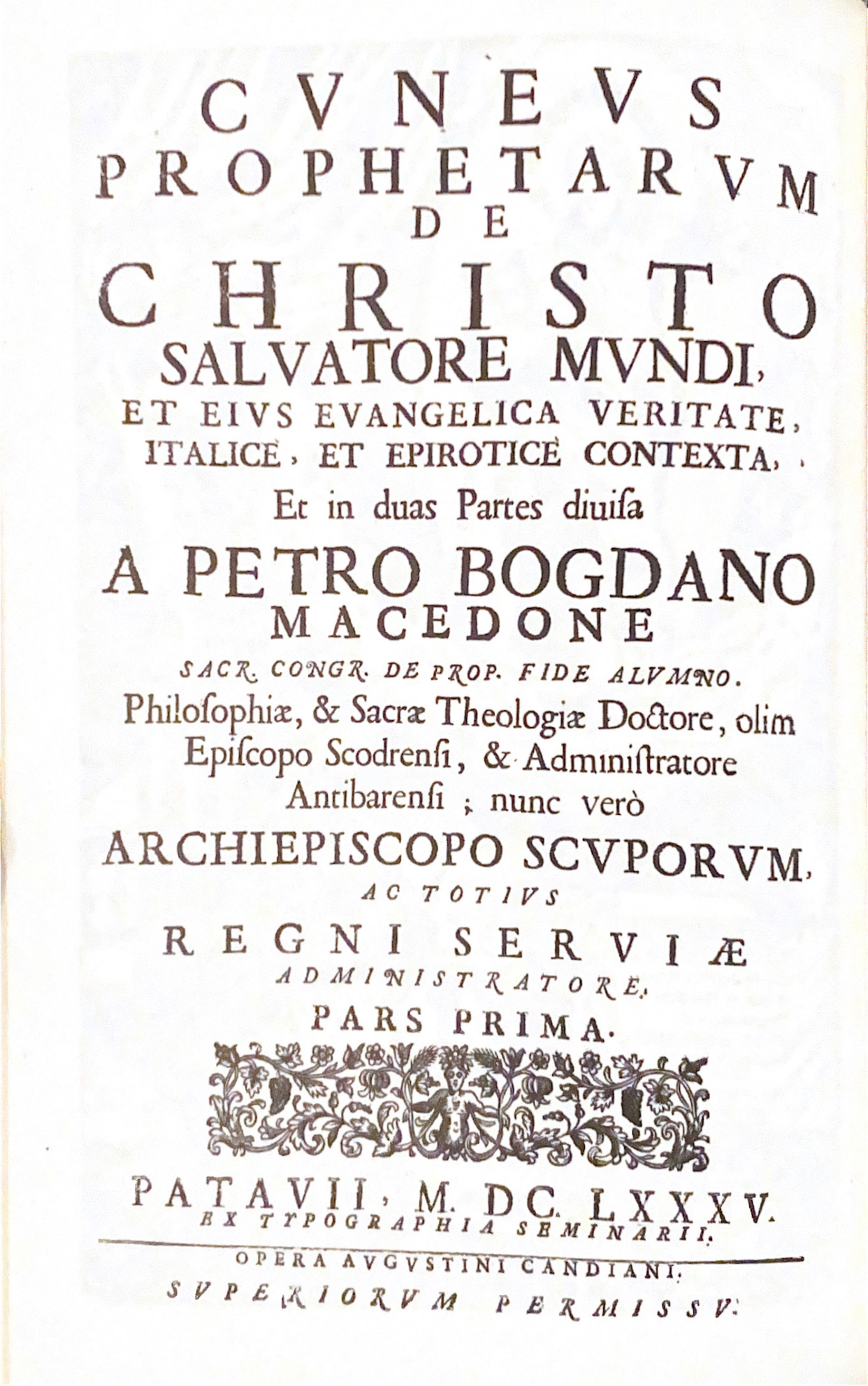
Title page of the first volume of Cuneus Prophetarum

Cuneus Prophetarum is divided in two volumes of four chapters each, containing two parallel columns, one written in Albanian while the other contains its Latin (in 1685 edition) or its Italian (in 1691 and 1702 edition) translation. The introductory part of the first volume contains dedications and eulogies in Albanian, Italian, Latin and Serbian. It also includes two eight-line poems written in Albanian. The first poem written by Llukë Bogdani, cousin of Pjetër Bogdani is titled Pjetër Bogdanit, argjupeshkëpit Skupsë, kushërinit tim dashunit (English: To my dear cousin Pjetër Bogdani, Archbishop of Shkup), while the second one is a philosophical poem written by Llukë Summa, a monk from Shkodër. The main subjects of the first volume derive from the Old Testament and its four chapters are:

1. How God created man.
2. The prophets and their metaphors concerning the coming of the Messiah.
3. The lives of the prophets and their prophecies.
4. The lives of the ten sibyls.

The second volume is entitled De vita Jesu Christi salvatoris mundi (English: On the life of Jesus Christ, saviour of the world), its main theological subjects derive from the New Testament, while its chapters include:

1. The life of Jesus Christ.
2. The miracles of Jesus Christ.
3. The suffering and death of Jesus Christ.
4. The resurrection and the second coming of Christ.

The fourth chapter of the second volume includes a translation from the Book of Daniel in Albanian, Arabic, Armenian, Greek, Hebrew, Italian, Latin and Syriac. This volume includes also a chapter on the life of Antichrist, an index in Albanian and Italian and a three-page supplementary appendix titled Antichita della Casa Bogdana (English: Antiquity of the House of the Bogdanis) regarding Pjetër Bogdani's family and genealogy.

== Legacy ==
Cuneus Prophetarum is considered to be the most prominent work of early Albanian literature. It covers issues of philosophy, science and theology as well as subjects regarding astronomy, physics, geography and history. Its works of poetry and prose examine motifs of literary theory. Cuneus Prophetarum is regarded as a humanist work of Baroque literature with a philosophical aim of approaching and knowing divinity and examining the problem of existence. The language used by Bogdani is an archaic form of Albanian and its use is regarded as one of the early literary forms of Albanian language.

Kryshten i shyityruory (English: The Sanctified Christian) written by Anton Santori and published in 1855 in Naples contains parts of Cuneus Prophetarum. Santori included excerpts of Cuneus Prophetarum in his book to symbolize the continuity of Albanian religious literature.

== Bibliography ==
Notes

References

- Elsie, Robert (2003). "Albanian Literature - an overview of its history and development". In Peter Jordan; et al. (eds.). Albanien: Geographie - Historische Anthropologie - Geschichte - Kultur - Postkommunistische Transformation. Vienna: Lang. pp. 243–276.
- Elsie, Robert (2005). Albanian literature: a short history (2005 ed.). I.B.Tauris. ISBN 978-1-84511-031-4. - Total pages: 291
