= Toma Raspasani =

Albanian Franciscan friar and vicar

don Toma Raspasani
- Born: 1648; Black Mountain of Skopje
- Died: 1718 (aged 69–70); Budapest
- Education: Jesuit Illyrian College
- Occupations: parish priest (fl. 1679); vicar of the Archbishop of Skopje, Pjetër Bogdani (fl. 1689); translator
- Known for: Organizing pro-Austrian rebels in Otoman empire during Great Turkish War
- Movement: pro-Austrian
- Family: Raspasani

Toma Raspasani (Italian: Tomasso Raspassani, c. 1648-1718) was an Franciscan friar and vicar, subordinate Pjetër Bogdani, Archbishop of Skopje, with whom he organized an pro-Austrian movement that would fight in the Great Turkish War against the Ottoman Empire.

== Life ==
He was born in 1648. His definite birthplace has not been established, and it is thought to have been in either Skopska Crna Gora, or the surroundings of Prizren or Peja. According to British author Noel Malcolm it was Skopska Crna Gora. At the time these were part of the Ottoman Sanjak of Üsküb and Sanjak of Prizren. He most likely enrolled in the primary school and theological school of Janjevo. Toma was educated by Jesuits at Illyrian college in Loreto. After studying in Italy he was appointed parish priest in Prizren in 1679. According to different sources, he spoke Albanian, Serbian, Latin and Italian. A rare letter written in Albanian sent to Propaganda Fide in Rome from Pult in Albania has been argued lately to have been written by Raspasani.

With the outbreak of the Great Turkish War, the Austrian Empire sought allies in Southeastern Europe. On November 1, or November 6, General Enea Silvio Piccolomini reached Prizren, where he according to sources was received by "an archbishop and a patriarch". This has been interpreted by some Yugoslav historians as being Albanian Catholic Pjetër Bogdani, Archbishop of Skopje, and Arsenije III Čarnojević, the Serbian Patriarch. Those sources claim that Piccolomini consulted with Patriarch Arsenije and Archbishop Bogdani about the organization of newly recruited rebels and providing food for them, and Raspasani helped Piccolomini a lot, as the negotiations went through him as he knew Latin and Italian. However the patriarch could not have been the Serbian Patriarch, since "he was absent from the region at that time". Pjetër Bogdani seemed to have played the leading role in organizing the Albanian pro-Austrian movement in the region, while Raspasani was also prominent. According to some sources, Raspasani was the one who gathered the Albanians by himself.

Piccolomini died in Prizren of plague on November 9, 1689, during negotiations. General Federico Veterani succeeded Piccolomini. Raspasani substituted the deceased Bogdani (1689†) as the leader of the Albanian pro-Austrian movement.

The Austrians began fortifying Niš, and Lieutenant colonel Antonije Znorić returned from Belgrade to Niš with 2,500 infantry of the Serbian Militia after the order of Veterani; Raspasani was also with them, as a translator.

Raspasani wrote in 1693 that many of the Catholics of Kosovo had left for Budapest, "where most of them died, some of hunger, others of disease".

== Later life and death ==
After the retreat of the Habsburgs from Kosovo in 1690, Raspasani moved together with the army towards Buda, where he stayed until the end of his life. His life is recorded there in archival documents of the city. Raspasani served holding a high position at one of the churches of the city, where he was close to the Jesuit order. His testament written just before his death in 1718 is still kept at the archival funds in Budapest.
