= Luca Bogdano =

Albanian poet (died 1687)

- Born: near Prizren, Ottoman Empire
- Died: 1687 near Kaçanik
- Other name: Llukë Bogdani
- Occupation: poet
- Relatives: Pjetër Bogdani (Cousin)
- Family: Bogdani

Luca Bogdano (Albanian: Llukë Bogdani, Italian: Luca Bogdano; died 1687) was an Albanian poet.

== Life ==
Born near Prizren he studied in the Catholic school of Yanova (now Janjevo), joined the Austrian forces during the Great Turkish War under the guidance of his cousin Archbishop Petro Bogdano and died near Kaçanik in 1687. An eighty-line poem titled Pjetër Bogdanit, argjupeshkëpit Skupsë, kushërinit tim dashunit (Lit. To my dear cousin Petro Bogdano, Archbishop of Skopje) and written by Luca Bogdano was published in the first version Cuneus Prophetarum in 1685. Petro Bogdano apparently polished the verses of panegyric improvised by Llukë. In later versions of the work the poem was removed as it was considered laudatory, and thus religiously inappropriate.
