= Pjetër Bogdani =

Roman Catholic archbishop (1627–1689)

Pjetër Bogdani HNO
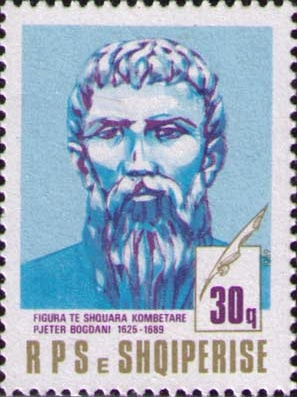
- Pjetër Bogdani on a 1989 Albania stamp
- Born: c. 1627; Gur, Ottoman Empire (modern-day Kosovo)
- Died: 6 December 1689 (aged 61–62); Pristina, Ottoman Empire (modern-day Kosovo)
- Other name: Pietro Bogdano
- Occupations: Catholic priest, writer, poet
- Known for: Author of the first prose work of substance originally written in Albanian
- Relatives: Andrea Bogdani (uncle); Gjergj Bogdani (nephew); Llukë Bogdani (cousin)
- Family: Bogdani
- Awards: Honor of the Nation

Pjetër Bogdani (Italian: Pietro Bogdano; 1627 – 6 December 1689) was an Albanian Catholic priest, philosopher and theologian of Albanian origin. He is the most original writer of Old Albanian literature during the Renaissance. He was the author of the Cuneus Prophetarum (The Band of the Prophets), 1685, the first prose work of substance written originally in (Gheg) Albanian (i.e. not a translation).

During the Great Turkish War of 1683-1699 he organized an uprising against the Ottoman Empire and a pro-Austrian movement among Albanians in Kosovo together with Toma Raspasani.

== Life and work ==
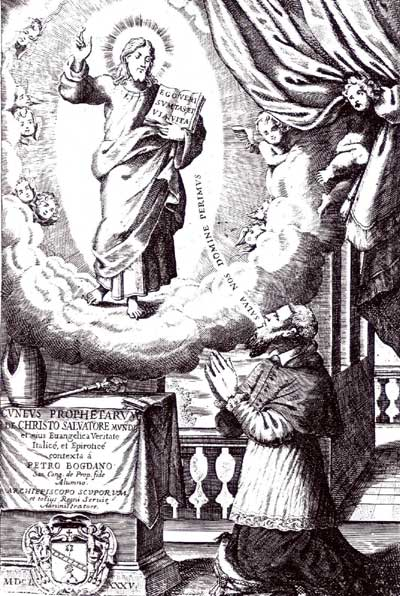
Frontispiece showing Pjetër Bogdani at prayer. From Bogdani's "Cuneus Prophetarum", Padua 1685.

He was born in the village of Gur in the area of Has, near Prizren in 1627. Its exact location is unknown, but Robert Elsie has proposed two modern day villages of Gjonaj and Breg Drini in Prizren area.

Bogdani was educated in the traditions of the Catholic Church. His uncle Andrea Bogdani (c. 1600–1683) was Archbishop of Skopje and author of a Latin-Albanian grammar, now lost. Bogdani is said to have received his initial schooling from the Franciscans at Chiprovtsi in modern northwestern Bulgaria and then studied at the Illyrian College of Loreto near Ancona, as had his predecessors Pjetër Budi and Frang Bardhi. From 1651 to 1654 he served as a parish priest in Pult and from 1654 to 1656 studied at the College of the Propaganda Fide in Rome where he graduated as a doctor of philosophy and theology. In 1656, he was named Bishop of Shkodra, a post he held for twenty-one years, and was also appointed Administrator of the Archdiocese of Antivari (Bar) until 1671.

During the most troubled years of the Ottoman - Austrian war, 1664–1669, he took refuge in the villages of Barbullush and Rjoll near Shkodra. A cave near Rjoll, in which he took refuge, still bears his name. Eventually, he was captured by the Ottomans and imprisoned in the fort of Shkodër. The bishop of Durrës, Shtjëfen Gaspëri later reported to the Propaganda Fide that he was rescued by the brothers Pepë and Nikollë Kastori. In 1677, he succeeded his uncle as Archbishop of Skopje and Administrator of Roman Catholic parishes in the Kingdom of Serbia. The Gashi and Krasniqja tribes were in frequent conflicts with one another until 1680, when Pjetër Bogdani managed to reconcile 24 blood feuds between the two tribes. His religious zeal and patriotic fervour kept him at odds with Ottoman forces, and in the atmosphere of war and confusion which reigned, he was obliged to flee to Ragusa, from where he continued on to Venice and Padua, taking his manuscripts with him. In Padua he was cordially received by Cardinal Gregorio Barbarigo, Bishop of Padua at that time, whom he had served in Rome. Cardinal Barbarigo was responsible for the church affairs in the East and as such he had a keen interest in the cultures of the Levant, including Albania. The cardinal had also founded a printing press in Padua, the Tipografia del Seminario, which served the needs of oriental languages and had fonts for Hebrew, Arabic and Armenian. Barbarigo was thus well disposed, willing and able to assist Bogdani in the latter's historic undertaking.

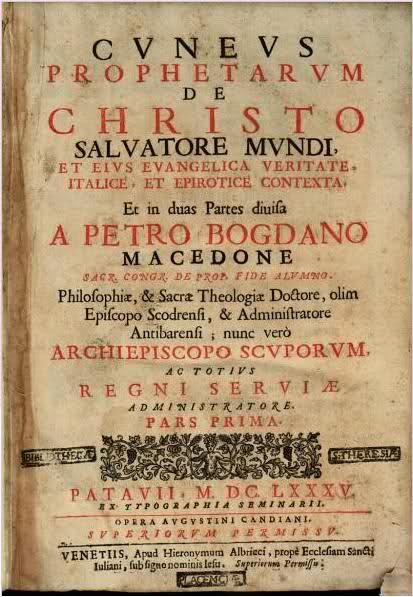
The title page of the Cuneus Profetarum, 1685

After arranging for the publication of the Cuneus Prophetarum, Bogdani returned to the Balkans in March 1686 and spent the next years promoting resistance to the armies of the Ottoman Empire, in particular in Kosovo. He and his vicar Toma Raspasani played a leading role in the pro-Austrian movement in Kosovo during the Great Turkish War. He contributed a force of 6,000 Albanian soldiers to the Austrian army which had arrived in Pristina and accompanied it to capture Prizren. There, however, he and much of his army were met by another equally formidable adversary, the plague. Bogdani returned to Pristina but succumbed to the disease there in 6 December 1689. His nephew, Gjergj Bogdani, reported in 1698 that his uncle's remains were later exhumed by Turkish and Tatar soldiers and fed to the dogs in the middle of the square in Pristina.

== Poetry ==
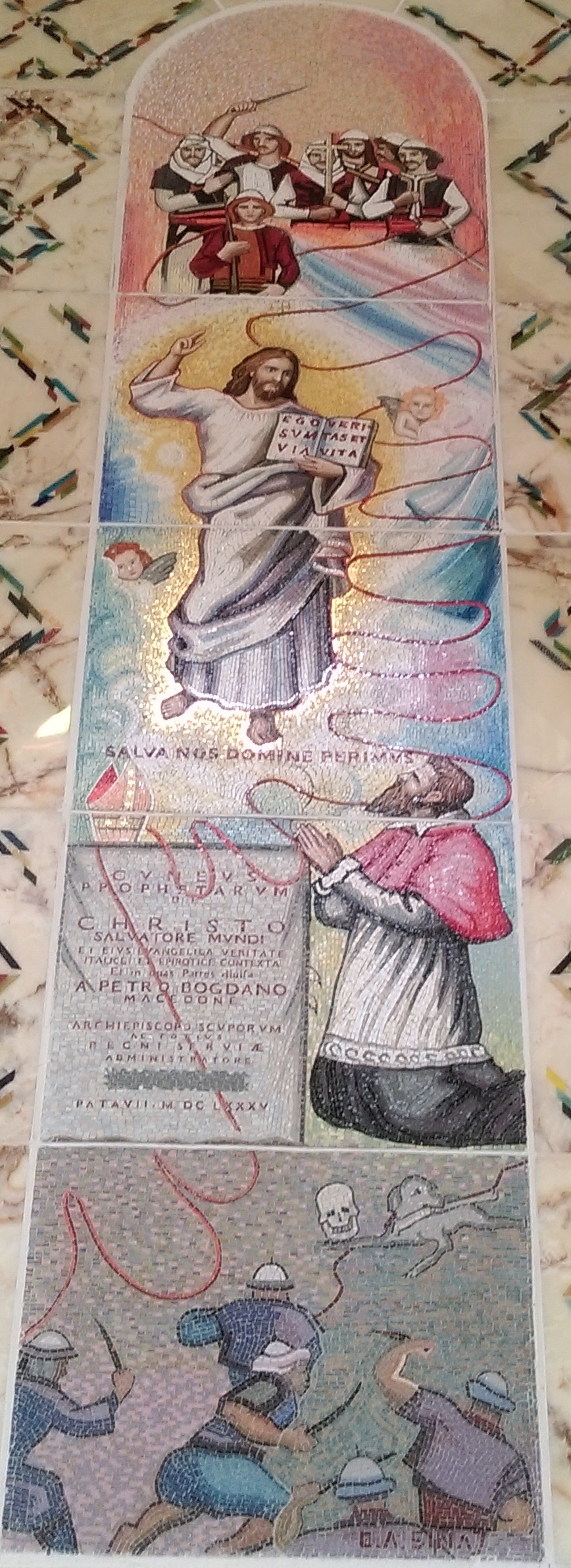
Stained glass depiction of Pjetër Bogdani at the Catholic Cathedral in Pristina

It was in Padua in 1685 that the Cuneus Prophetarum, his vast treatise on theology, was published in Albanian and Italian with the assistance of Cardinal Barbarigo. Bogdani had finished the Albanian version ten years earlier but was refused permission to publish it by the Propaganda Fide which ordered that the manuscript be translated first, no doubt to facilitate the work of the censor. The full title of the published version is:

"Cvnevs prophetarvm de Christo salvatore mvndi et eivs evangelica veritate, italice et epirotice contexta, et in duas partes diuisa a Petro Bogdano Macedone, Sacr. Congr. de Prop. Fide alvmno, Philosophiae & Sacrae Theologiae Doctore, olim Episcopo Scodrensi & Administratore Antibarensi, nunc vero Archiepiscopo Scvporvm ac totivs regni Serviae Administratore" (The Band of the Prophets Concerning Christ, Saviour of the World and his Gospel Truth, edited in Italian and Epirotic and divided into two parts by Pjetër Bogdani of Macedonia, student of the Holy Congregation of the Propaganda Fide, doctor of philosophy and holy theology, formerly Bishop of Shkodra and Administrator of Antivari and now Archbishop of Skopje and Administrator of all the Kingdom of Serbia.)

The Cuneus Prophetarum was printed in the Latin alphabet as used in Italian, with the addition of the same Cyrillic characters employed by Pjetër Budi and Frang Bardhi. Bogdani seems therefore to have had access to their works. During his studies at the College of the Propaganda Fide, he is known to have requested Albanian books from the college printer: "five copies of the Christian Doctrine and five Albanian dictionaries," most certainly the works of Budi and Bardhi. In a report to the Propaganda Fide in 1665, he also mentions a certain Euangelii in Albanese (Gospels in Albanian) of which he had heard, a possible reference to Buzuku's missal of 1555.

The Cuneus Prophetarum was published in two parallel columns, one in Albanian and one in Italian, and is divided into two volumes, each with four sections (scala). The first volume, which is preceded by dedications and eulogies in Latin, Albanian, Serbian and Italian, and includes two eight-line poems in Albanian, one by his cousin Luca Bogdani and one by Luca Summa, deals primarily with themes from the Old Testament: i) How God created man, ii) The prophets and their metaphors concerning the coming of the Messiah, iii) The lives of the prophets and their prophecies, iv) The songs of the ten Sibyls. The second volume, entitled De vita Jesu Christi salvatoris mundi (On the life of Jesus Christ, saviour of the world), is devoted mostly to the New Testament: i) The life of Jesus Christ, ii) The miracles of Jesus Christ, iii) The suffering and death of Jesus Christ, iv) The resurrection and second coming of Christ. This section includes a translation from the Book of Daniel, 9. 24–26, in eight languages: Latin, Greek, Armenian, Syriac, Hebrew, Arabic, Italian and Albanian, and is followed by a chapter on the life of the Antichrist, by indices in Italian and Albanian and by a three-page appendix on the Antichità della Casa Bogdana (Antiquity of the House of the Bogdanis).

The work was reprinted twice under the title L'infallibile verità della cattolica fede, Venice 1691 and 1702 (The infallible truth of the Catholic faith).

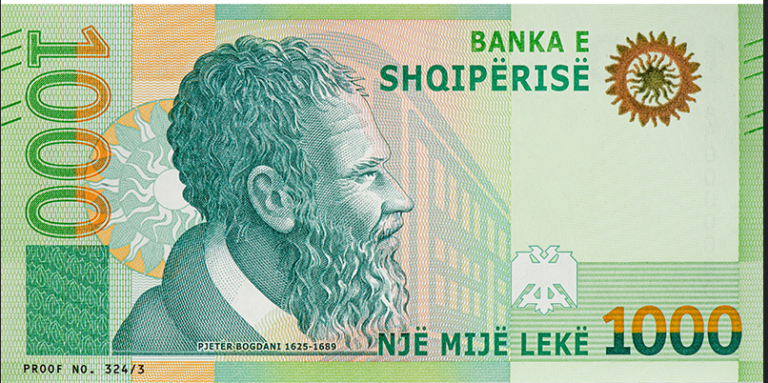
1000 Lekë

The Cuneus Prophetarum is considered to be the masterpiece of early Albanian literature and is the first work in Albanian of full artistic and literary quality. In scope, it covers philosophy, theology and science (with digressions on geography, astronomy, physics and history). With its poetry and literary prose, it touches on questions of aesthetic and literary theory. It is a humanist work of the Baroque Age steeped in the philosophical traditions of Plato, Aristotle, St Augustine, and St Thomas Aquinas. Bogdani's fundamental philosophical aim is a knowledge of God, an unravelling of the problem of existence, for which he strives with reason and intellect.

Bogdani's talents are certainly most evident in his prose. In his work we encounter for the first time what may be considered an Albanian literary language. As such, he may justly bear the title of father of Albanian prose. His modest religious poetry is, nonetheless, not devoid of interest. The corpus of his verse are the Songs of the Ten Sibyls (the Cumaean, Libyan, Delphic, Persian, Erythraean, Samian, Cumanian, Hellespontic, Phrygian, and Tiburtine), which are imbued with the Baroque penchant for religious themes and Biblical allusions.

== Last years and death ==
Coat of arms of Bogdani

In October of 1689 a Habsburg general named Johann Norbert Piccolomini had penetrated deep inside the Ottoman territory with his army, reaching Pristina. It would become the chief town of his short lived campaign. It is during this initiative that many local figures joined the Habsburgs to form an overall revolt against the Ottoman Empire. Reports from the time consider Bogdani as a key local figure of this movement. In some media he is even mentioned as the ‘Archbishop of Albania’, a position that did not exist at the time. The campaign was, however, short lived. In the early days of November 1689 when Piccolomini died after a plague infection, Bogdani stood by him in Prizren. As a bishop he even administered the religious sacraments. There he would get infected himself. A few weeks later, in early December, he was transferred to Pristina, where some German doctors had improvised a hospital. Succumbing to the disease, he died in the early morning of the 6th of December. By him stood several Habsburg generals, and an unnamed Albanian prelate. In a testament written just a few days before he seems to have been prepared for his faith:

This is my last will, for this testament, so that it can be implemented as best as possible after my death. And the auditor and other officials who stand in the quarters here in the said city [Pristina], were ordered to be summoned; I myself have asked them to sign and seal this will after me with their hand and seal. This was done in the city of Pristina and on the above day. Pjeter Bogdani Archbishop of Skopje, hand himself.

He was buried in the main mosque of Pristina, then turned church, on the right side of the altar. As was witnessed by his nephew, only a few weeks later, when the city would fall again in the hands of the Ottomans, his body was removed by the tartar soldiers and fed to the dogs in the main market of the city.

== Legacy ==
The National Library of Kosovo in Pristina is named after Pjetër Bogdani. He is depicted on the obverse of the Albanian 1000 lekë banknote issued since 1996.

== See also ==
- Culture of Albania

== Sources ==
- Malcolm, Noel (1998). Kosovo: A Short History. Macmillan. ISBN 9780333666128.
