= 1474 =

1474 in various calendars
- Gregorian calendar: 1474; MCDLXXIV
- Ab urbe condita: 2227
- Armenian calendar: 923; ԹՎ ՋԻԳ
- Assyrian calendar: 6224
- Balinese saka calendar: 1395–1396
- Bengali calendar: 880–881
- Berber calendar: 2424
- English Regnal year: 13 Edw. 4 – 14 Edw. 4
- Buddhist calendar: 2018
- Burmese calendar: 836
- Byzantine calendar: 6982–6983
- Chinese calendar: 癸巳年 (Water Snake); 4171 or 3964 — to — 甲午年 (Wood Horse); 4172 or 3965
- Coptic calendar: 1190–1191
- Discordian calendar: 2640
- Ethiopian calendar: 1466–1467
- Hebrew calendar: 5234–5235
- Hindu calendars
- Vikram Samvat: 1530–1531
- Shaka Samvat: 1395–1396
- Kali Yuga: 4574–4575
- Holocene calendar: 11474
- Igbo calendar: 474–475
- Iranian calendar: 852–853
- Islamic calendar: 878–879
- Japanese calendar: Bunmei 6 (文明６年)
- Javanese calendar: 1390–1391
- Julian calendar: 1474; MCDLXXIV
- Korean calendar: 3807
- Minguo calendar: 438 before ROC 民前438年
- Nanakshahi calendar: 6
- Thai solar calendar: 2016–2017
- Tibetan calendar: ཆུ་མོ་སྦྲུལ་ལོ་ (female Water-Snake); 1600 or 1219 or 447 — to — ཤིང་ཕོ་རྟ་ལོ་ (male Wood-Horse); 1601 or 1220 or 448

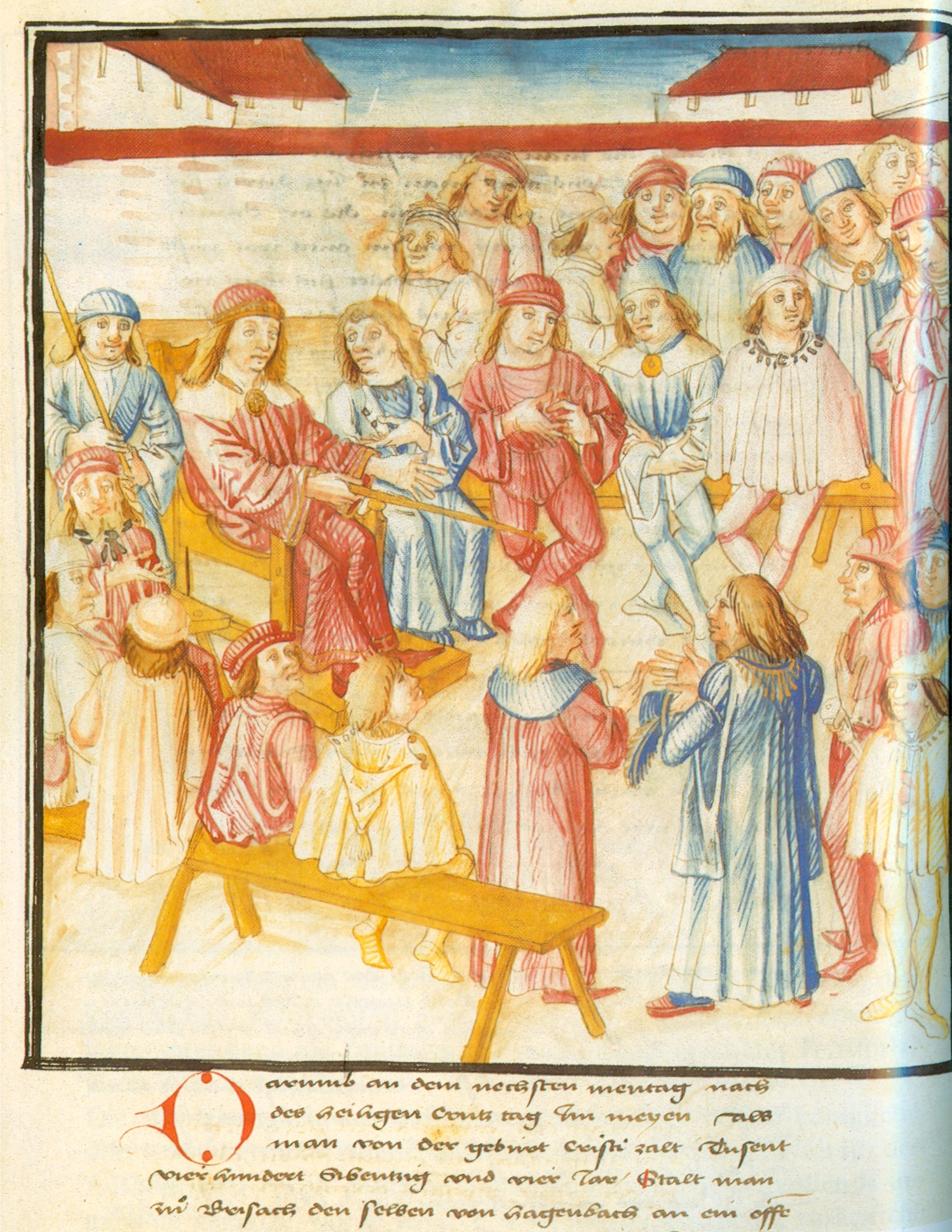
May 9: The first war crimes trial in history is held in one day as Peter von Hagenbach is tried, convicted and executed.

Year 1474 (MCDLXXIV) was a common year starting on Saturday of the Julian calendar.

== Events ==
=== January–March ===
- January 6 – At the age of one year and nine months, Bianca Maria Sforza, the daughter of the Duke of Milan, Galeazzo Maria Sforza, is betrothed to the 9-year-old, Philibert I of Savoy, as part of an alliance between the two independent Italian duchies.
- February 7 – The Hungarian town of Varad is attacked by an Ottoman Empire army of 7,000 cavalry, commanded by General Mihaloğlu Ali Bey, and its inhabitants are taken prisoner.
- February 21 – The Treaty of Ófalu is signed between the Kingdom of Poland and the Kingdom of Hungary.
- February 28 – The Treaty of Utrecht puts an end to the Anglo-Hanseatic War, restoring the status quo that had existed before the war, with the Kingdom of England and the states of the Hanseatic League agreeing to respect each other's trading rights.
- March 19 – The Senate of the Republic of Venice enacts the Venetian Patent Statute, one of the earliest patent systems in the world. New and inventive devices, once put into practice, have to be communicated to the Republic to obtain the right to prevent others from using them. This is considered the first modern patent system.

=== April–June ===
- April 24 – The members of the Hungarian nobility ratify the treaty with Poland after King Matthias had given his assent on February 27.
- May 9 – The first war crimes trial in recorded history begins in Breisach am Rhein in Upper Alsace as the Burgundian general Peter von Hagenbach is put on trial for allowing his troops to murder and rape civilians during the Burgundian Wars. The trial is held before a panel of 28 judges drawn from Breibach and surrounding Alsatian towns, and is conducted outside before a large crowd. During the trial, Hagenbach becomes the first known person to raise the "superior orders defense", stating that he was simply following orders made his commanders. After deliberating for a few hours, the judges unanimously find Hagenbach guilty and sentenced to death. At the end of his one-day trial, Hagenbach is decapitated.
- May 14 – Charles the Bold, duke of Burgundy, begins peace talks with rebels in the Electorate of Cologne in hopes of bringing an agreement that would make the Electorate a protectorate of Burgundy. The talks fail to get a result and Charles begins a war against Colognian cities a month later.
- May 28 – The English royal title of Duke of York is created by King Edward IV for his second-born son, Prince Richard. Thereafter, the title of Duke of York is reserved for the second son of the English monarch, while the title of Prince of Wales is reserved for the first-born son.
- June 15 – Venetian captain general Triadan Gritti, with six armed galleys to protect the Albanian coast, destroys Ottoman forces attempting to take over Venetian Albania, and forces the others to retreat.

=== July–September ===
- July 25 – By signing the Treaty of London, Charles the Bold of Burgundy agrees to support Edward IV of England's planned invasion of France.
- August 8 – The siege of Shkodra by the Ottoman Empire ends when the city is freed by a combined army of 25,000 troops from the Republic of Venice commanded by Antonio Loredan, supplemented by the Principality of Zeta and Albanian resistance forces. Nearly all of the 8,000 Ottoman troops commanded by Hadım Suleiman Pasha are killed.
- August 15 – In the city of Modica on the island of Sicily, a massacre is carried out in the Jewish neighborhood of Cartellone, and 360 Jews are killed in what is later referred to as the "Massacre of the Assumption".
- August 26 – James III, the one-year old de jure King of Cyprus, dies 20 days after his first birthday, apparently from malaria. His mother, Catherine Cornaro, who had been serving as regent since her son's birth, becomes the ruling queen of Cyprus.
- September 21 – Ernest I becomes the new monarch of the independent Principality of Anhalt-Dessau upon the death of his father George I, who had ruled for 69 years.

=== October–December ===
- October 14 – King Ferdinand of Naples sends his son, Prince Frederick, to Burgundy in hopes of an alliance between the Kingdom of Naples and the Duchy of Burgundy to be secured by Frederick's marriage to Mary of Burgundy, daughter of the Duke, Charles the Bold. The proposal is rejected by Burgundy.
- October 26 – In a peace treaty between King Edward IV of England and King James III of Scotland, an agreement is reached for the betrothal and eventual marriage of King Edward's daughter Cecily to King James' eldest son and future King of Scotland, James, Duke of Rothsay.
- November 2 – An alliance pact is signed between the Duchy of Milan, the Republic of Venice and the Republic of Florence.
- December 12 – Upon the death of Henry IV of Castile, a civil war ensues between his designated successor Isabella I of Castile, and her niece Juana, who is supported by her husband, Afonso V of Portugal. Isabella wins the civil war after a lengthy struggle, when her husband, the newly crowned Ferdinand II of Aragon, comes to her aid.
- December 14 – Pietro Mocenigo is elected as the new Doge of the Republic of Venice 13 days after the death of the Doge Nicolò Marcello.
- December 26 – The betrothal of the son of King James III of Scotland and King Edward IV of England is formalized by proxy. After King Edward dies, the planned marriage is called off by the new monarch, Richard III.

=== Date unknown ===
- Marsilio Ficino completes his book Theologia Platonica (Platonic Theology).
- Axayacatl defeats the Matlatzinca of the Toluca Valley.

== Births ==
- January 7 – Thihathura II of Ava (d. 1501)
- March 21 – Angela Merici, Italian religious leader and saint (d. 1540)
- May 5
  - Juan Diego, Roman Catholic Saint from Mexico (d. 1548)
  - Giovanni Stefano Ferrero, Italian cardinal (d. 1510)
- May 18 – Isabella d'Este, Marquise of Mantua (d. 1539)
- August 6 – Luigi de' Rossi, Italian cardinal (d. 1519)
- September 8 – Ludovico Ariosto, Italian poet (d. 1533)
- October 6 – Luigi d'Aragona, Italian cardinal (d. 1518)
- October 7 – Bernhard III, Margrave of Baden-Baden (d. 1536)
- October 13 – Mariotto Albertinelli, High Renaissance Italian painter of the Florentine school (d. 1515)
- November 7 – Lorenzo Campeggio, Italian Cardinal (d. 1539)
- November 8 – Francesco Vettori, Italian diplomat (d. 1539)
- November 11 – Bartolomé de las Casas, Spanish Dominican friar, historian, and social reformer (d. 1566)
- December 24 – Bartolomeo degli Organi, Italian musician (d. 1539)
- date unknown
  - Anacaona, Taino queen and poet (d. 1503)
  - Juan Diego, Mexican Catholic saint (d. 1548)
  - Giacomo Pacchiarotti, Italian painter (d. 1539 or 1540)
  - Cuthbert Tunstall, English bishop and diplomat (d. 1559)
  - Humphrey Kynaston, English highwayman (d. 1534)
- probable
  - Sebastian Cabot, Venetian explorer (d. c. 1557)
  - Edward Guilford, Lord Warden of the Cinque Ports of England (d. 1534)
  - Stephen Hawes, English poet (d. c. 1521)
  - Sir John Seymour, English courtier (d. 1536)
  - Perkin Warbeck, pretender to the throne of England (d. 1499)

== Deaths ==
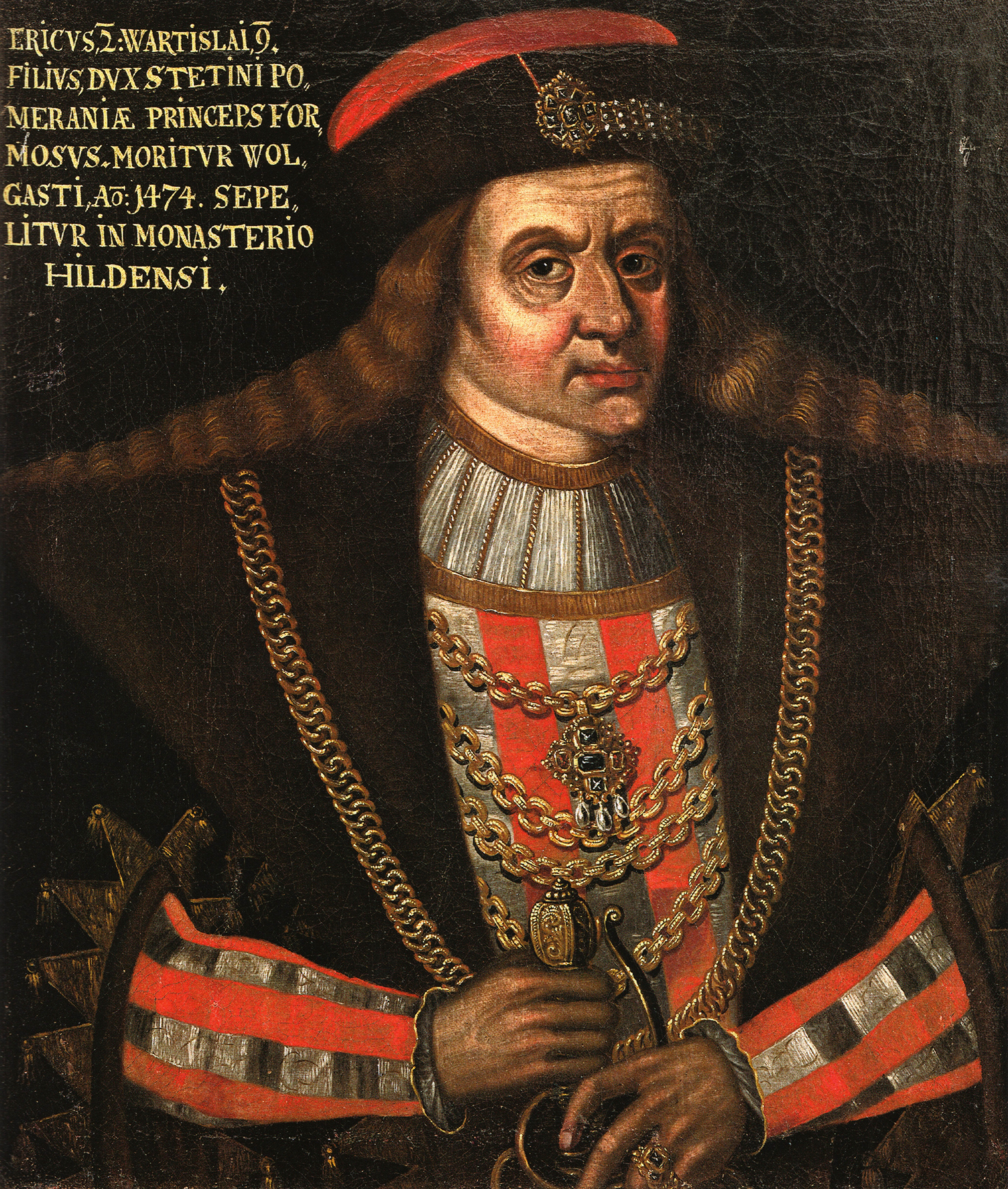
Eric II, Duke of Pomerania died 5 July

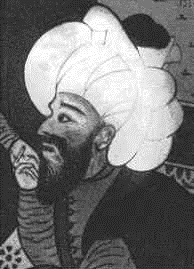
Ali Qushji died 16 December

- January 3 – Pietro Riario, Catholic cardinal (b. 1447)
- February 26 – Eom Heung-do, local official of Joseon (b. 1404)
- March 22 – Iacopo III Appiani, Prince of Piombino (b. 1422)
- April 14 – Anna of Brunswick-Grubenhagen, daughter of Duke Eric I of Brunswick-Grubenhagen (b. 1414)
- April 30 – Queen Gonghye, Korean royal consort (b. 1456)
- May 4 – Alain de Coëtivy, Catholic cardinal (b. 1407)
- May 9
  - Alfonso Vázquez de Acuña, Roman Catholic prelate, Bishop of Jaén and Bishop of Mondoñedo (b. 1474)
  - Peter von Hagenbach, Alsatian knight and ruler (b. 1423)
- May 11 – John Stanberry, Bishop of Hereford
- May 14 – Ch'oe Hang, Korean politician (b. 1409)
- July 5 – Eric II, Duke of Pomerania-Wolgast (b. 1418)
- July 9 – Isotta degli Atti, Italian Renaissance woman (b. 1432)
- July 18 – Mahmud Pasha Angelović, Grand Vizier of the Ottoman Empire (b. 1420)
- August 1 – Walter Blount, 1st Baron Mountjoy, English politician (b. 1416)
- August 16 – Ricciarda of Saluzzo (b. 1410)
- August 26 – James III of Cyprus (b. 1473)
- September 21 – George I, Prince of Anhalt-Dessau (b. 1390)
- October 1 – Juan Pacheco, Spanish noble and politician (b. 1419)
- November – William Canynge, English merchant (b. c. 1399)
- November 27 – Guillaume Dufay, Flemish composer (b. 1397)
- December 1 – Nicolò Marcello, Doge of Venice (b. 1397)
- December 11 – King Henry IV of Castile (b. 1425)
- December 16 – Ali Qushji, Ottoman astronomer and mathematician (b. 1403)
- date unknown
  - Gomes Eannes de Azurara, Portuguese chronicler (b. c. 1410)
  - Antoinette de Maignelais, French royal favorite (b. 1434)
  - Gendun Drup, 1st Dalai Lama (b. 1391)
- probable
  - Walter Frye, English composer
  - Jehan de Waurin, French chronicler
