= Triadan Gritti =

- Born: 1390
- Died: 1474 (aged 83–84)
- Occupations: diplomat and military officer
- Known for: being Venetian captain-general

Triadan Gritti was a 15th-century Venetian nobleman who was the Venetian captain general and commander-in-chief of Scutari.

== Diplomatic and military career ==
In 1451 Gritti served as the Venetian ambassador to the Papal States.

When the news of Ottoman preparations for the siege of Scutari reached Venice in early 1474, Triadan Gritti, who was 84 years old then, was appointed as the Venetian captain general instead of Pietro Mocenigo. Gritti commanded the Venetian fleet of six galleys that sailed early in May 1474 to protect the coasts of Albania Veneta, and especially the mouths of the Buna River. By summer Gritti's forces were joined by the fleet commanded by Mocenigo, who left Cyprus after first installing Caterina Cornaro as queen of the island. Gritti and Mocenigo were later co-commanders of the Venetian relief forces sent to Scutari.

Ottoman forces attempted to blockade the Venetian fleet in the Buna by clogging the mouth of the river with tree trunks, just as the Albanian voivode Mazarek from the Serbian Despotate did during the Second Scutari War. Gritti returned down the river with his fleet and destroyed the Ottoman forces on 15 June 1474. In Scutari, Gritti and Mocenigo ordered Leonardo Boldù to find Ivan Crnojević and urge him to mobilize as many of his men as possible to help the Venetians during the siege. Boldu was also ordered to transport Crnojević's cavalry and infantry over Lake Scutari.

After the discovery of the treason committed by Andreas Humoj, a member of Humoj family, during the Siege of Scutari, Gritti sentenced him to death and had him executed by a man from Tuzi. In spite of his efforts, however, Gritti was not able to deliver to Scutari all the goods that his fleet carried because many of his ships were trapped in the shallow waters of the Buna near Shirgj.

== Death ==
Gritti and Bembo died of malaria in 1474 in Kotor. They both contracted it during the siege of Scutari when they participated in several skirmishes with Ottoman forces near the mouth of the Buna River.

== Sources ==
- Božić, Ivan (1979), Nemirno pomorje XV veka (in Serbian), Beograd: Srpska književna zadruga, OCLC 5845972

Preceded by Pietro Mocenigo	Venetian captain general 1474 – 1474	Succeeded by
