= Siege of Shkodra (1474) =

Battle in 1474

Siege of Shkodra Rrethimi i Shkodrës
Date	Spring 1474 – 8 August 1474
Location	Shkodër, Albania Veneta 42.0465°N 19.4935°E
Result	Victory of Venice, Zeta and Albanian Rebels

Belligerents
Ottoman Empire	Republic of Venice; Albanian resistance forces Principality of Zeta

Commanders and leaders
Hadım Suleiman Pasha	Antonio Loredan; Pietro Mocenigo; Triadan Gritti; Leonardo Boldù Ivan Crnojević

Strength
8,000	25,000

Casualties and losses
7,000 Ottoman soldiers killed	Unknown number of soldiers and 3,000 civilians from Scutari (primary source)

The siege of Shkodra (Albanian: Rrethimi i Shkodrës) of 1474 was an Ottoman attack upon Venetian-controlled Shkodra (Venetian: Scutari) in Albania Veneta during the First Ottoman-Venetian War (1463–79). It is not to be confused with the siege of Shkodra of 1478–79.

== Siege ==
Strong Ottoman forces besieged Shkodra in spring 1474. Mehmed had dispatched the governor of Rumelia, Hadım Suleiman Pasha, with about 8,000 men, but they were repulsed by commander Antonio Loredan and feared Venetian reinforcements. According to some sources, when the Scutari garrison complained for lack of food and water, Loredan told them "If you are hungry, here is my flesh; if you are thirsty, I give you my blood."

The Venetian Senate ordered all available galleys to transport archers to Shkodra through river Buna. All Venetian governors were also ordered to help the besieged city. According to Venetian reports in July Shkodra was besieged by 50,000 Ottoman soldiers who were supported by heavy artillery.

At the beginning of 1474 the whole region around Shkodra, including the abandoned Balec, came under Ottoman rule. According to some sources the Ottoman sultan had intentions to rebuild Podgorica and Balec in 1474 and to settle them with 5,000 Turkish families in order to establish an additional obstacle for cooperation of Crnojević's Zeta and besieged Venetian Shkodra.

During their 1474 campaign Ottomans damaged Alessio and razed Dagnum castle.

Triadan Gritti was appointed as Venetian captain general instead of Pietro Mocenigo. Gritti led the Venetian fleet of six galleys which sailed early in May 1474 to protect the coast of Albania Veneta and especially the mouths of river Buna. When the Venetian fleet entered Buna the Ottoman forces attempted to block it by clogging the mouth of Buna with cut tree trunks, just like Albanian voivode Mazarek did during Second Scutari War. Gritti returned his fleet down the river and destroyed Ottoman forces on 15 June 1474. Despite all of his efforts, Gritti was not able to deliver to Scutari all goods his fleet carried because many of his ships were trapped in the shallow waters of Buna near Shirgj.

When Gritti joined Mocenigo in Shkodra and they both ordered Leonardo Boldù to find Ivan Crnojević and to urge him to mobilize as many of his men as possible to help Venetians during the Siege of Shkodra. Boldù was also ordered to transport Crnojević's cavalry and infantry over the Shkodra Lake. Ivan Crnojević had an important role in the defense of the Shkodra because he provided connection with Kotor and supplied the city through Žabljak or Shkodra Lake, fighting simultaneously against strong Ottoman forces. He transported men and woods from Kotor over the hills into Žabljak where he built fustas which surprised Ottomans at Shkodra Lake. During the whole summer Ivan Crnojević participated in military actions. He controlled Shkodra Lake with three fustas and 15 smaller ships, which was very important because the Venetian fleet (composed of 34 larger and about 100 smaller ships) was unable to sail further than Shirgj. Boldù was able to reach the besieged city from Žabljak thanks to the ships of Ivan Crnojević. The crew of Venetian ships together with stratioti from Greece joined the defenders in the besieged city and, according to some Venetian reports, their total number reached 25,000.

After the discovery of the treason committed by Andreas Humoj, a member of Humoj family, during the siege, Gritti sentenced him to death and had him executed by a man from Tuzi.

Between 7,000 and 20,000 Ottoman soldiers are reported to have been killed, and approximately 3,000 civilians from Scutari died of thirst and hunger. In the siege, the outer walls were damaged significantly. The citizens rebuilt the walls in anticipation of a stronger Ottoman attack later. The Ottomans did return in 1478 to conquer Shkodra.

== Sources ==
=== Primary ===
- Barletius, Marinus. De obsidione Scodrensi [The Siege of Shkodra]. Venice: B. de Vitalibus, 1504.
- A. Pashazade, Tursun, Bidlisi, K. Pashazade, Kivami, et al., in Pulaha, Selami (ed.). Lufta shqiptaro-turke në shekullin XV: Burime osmane [Albanian-Turkish Wars in the Fifteenth Century: Ottoman Sources] (a compendium of Ottoman chronicles in both the original languages and Albanian translations). Tiranë: Universiteti Shtetëror i Tiranës, Instituti i Historisë dhe Gjuhësisë, 1968.

=== Secondary ===
- Babinger, Franz (1992) [1978]. Mehmed the Conqueror and His Time. Bollingen Series 96. Translated from the German by Ralph Manheim. Edited, with a preface, by William C. Hickman. Princeton, New Jersey: Princeton University Press. ISBN 0-691-09900-6.
- Pulaha, Selami. (1968). Lufta shqiptaro-turke në shekullin XV. Burime Osmane [Albanian-Turkish Wars in the Fifteenth Century: Ottoman Sources]. Tirana: Universiteti Shtetëror.
- Srejović, Dragoslav (1981), Istorija srpskog naroda. Knj. 1, Od najstarijih vremena do maričke bitke (1371) [History of Serbs, Book 1, From earliest times to Battle of Marica (1371)] (in Serbian), Belgrade: Srpska književna zadruga, OCLC 456125379
- Božić, Ivan (1979), Nemirno pomorje XV veka (in Serbian), Beograd: Srpska književna zadruga, OCLC 5845972
