= Moneta family =

Medieval noble family

- Noble family
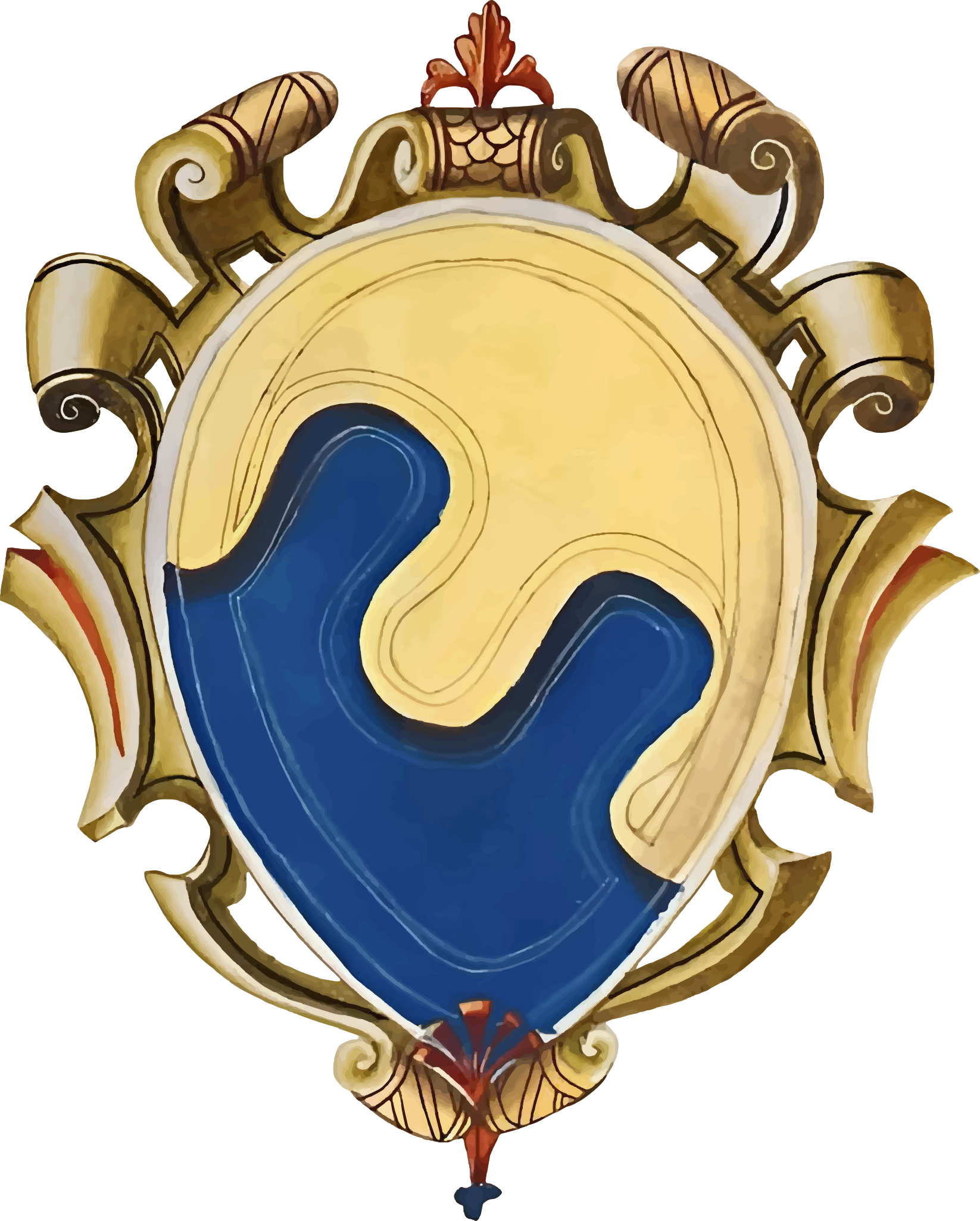
- Coat of arms of the Moneta, as depicted in the compendium "Insignia Veneta, Mantuana, Bononiensia, Anconitana, Urbinatia, Perugiensia - BSB Cod.icon. 274" from the mid-16th century.
- Country: Montenegro, Albania
- Current region: Scutari, Principality of Zeta, Serbian Despotate and Venetian Republic (modern day Albania)
- Members: Rajko, Jelena, Nicholas, Jacob
- Connected families: Mrnjavčević

The Moneta family was a 15th-century noble family of Zeta, Serbian Despotate and Venetian Republic in the region of Scutari (modern day Albania). They first served Zeta's Lord Balša III and Serbian despot Stefan Lazarević before they became pronoiars of the Venetian Republic in 1423. Their religion was Eastern Orthodox and they ruled the land between rivers Bojana and Drin. The most notable members of the Moneta family include Rajko Moneta, his wife Jelena and their three sons. First Rajko and then his sons participated in numerous military conflicts including the Second Scutari War, the Albanian–Venetian War (1447–1448) and the Ottoman sieges of Scutari, first in 1474 and then 1478/1479. After Scutari was captured by the Ottomans in 1479 Nicholas, one of the sons who became voivode of Scutari, went to Venice to join his wife and their five children who took refuge in Venice in 1478 before the last Ottoman siege of Scutari started.

== Zeta and Serbian Despotate ==
Rajko Moneta was a nobleman in service of Balša III. He was married to Jelena, a daughter of Jelisanta, a granddaughter of Olivera Mrnjavčević and a great-granddaughter of King Vukašin Mrnjavčević. Rajko controlled four big villages and large areas of land. Balsha III took many Venetian prisoners when he captured Drivast at the end of August 1419 and exchanged them for his three noble men captured by Venice, one of them being Rajko Moneta. After death of Balsha III Rajko Moneta served despot Stefan Lazarević, but decided to leave him in 1423, during the Second Scutari War.

== Venetian pronoier ==
As Venetian pronoier Rajko Moneta controlled four salt ponds in Grbalj valley near Kotor. After the Second Scutari War Venice did not allow anybody to sell salt from Grbalj anywhere else except at Kotor market, not even to loyal Venetian vassal Nicholas Moneta.

Olivera Mrnjavčević, a great-grandmother of Rajko's wife Jelena, built the Church of the Holy Virgin Mary in Lorenc (unknown place which did not belong to Scutari region) sometime before 1371. The property of the church was later increased with the gifts of Balša III. Based on the jus patronatus this church was inherited by the descendants of Olivera, Jelena and her sons Jacob and Nicholas. Nicholas and Jacob Moneta complained to Venetian Senate because the governor of Scutari gave two churches which belonged to Olivera's legacy to two abbots of his choice.

In 1443 the Venetians gave tax benefits to Rajko Moneta to stimulate settling of the village of St. Vraza (Serbian: Свети Врачи).

Members of the Moneta family (three sons of Rajko Moneta) participated in the Albanian–Venetian War (1447–1448) as Venetian pronoiers struggling against Skanderbeg.

Between 1456 and August 1457 a small war was waged between two branches of the Dukagjini family. Between Ottoman supported Lekë and Pal Dukagjini on one side and Draga Dukagjini, son of Nicholas Dukagjini, supported by Venice. In this war Moneta family, together with Skanderbeg and Humoj family served Venetian forces.

Nicholas Moneta was a wealthy Venetian patrician and voivode of Scutari who fought against the Ottomans during the Siege of Krujë (1466–1467) (joined by Skanderbeg and some members of the Dukagjini family). Nicholas Moneta and two other Orthodox Christians were authorized by the Senate to be procurators of Serbian churches on Skadar lake. Jacob Moneta (Serbian: Јаков Монета) borrowed supplies and money to Venetian governors. Once he borrowed some money to Zuan Contarini to pay the salary to the Venetian mercenaries in Krujë.

=== Ottoman sieges of Scutari ===
Jacob and Nicholas fought against the Ottomans during two sieges of Scutari, one in 1474 and another in 1478–1479. Marin Barleti in his work about the siege of Shkodra describes Jacob Moneta as Venetian officer who fought against the Ottomans. During the Siege of Shkodra (1478—1479) Nicholas was a commander of cavalry. In January 1478, before the siege has started, his wife and their five children went to Venice together with wives and children of many other noblemen from Scutari, including the wife of Koja Humoj and their daughter. The Venetian Senate helped Nicholas' wife with initial donation of 15 ducats and monthly payments of 5 ducats, which was the biggest donation granted to some refugee family from Shkodër. After the Ottomans captured Scutari Nicholas joined his family in Venice. The descendants of Rajko Moneta who took refuge in Venice lived in poverty.
