= Mazarek (vojvoda) =

Albanian nobleman and general

- vojvoda
- Reign: 15th century
- Born: Second half of the 14th century
- Died: After 1422
- Occupation: Nobility of the Serbian Despotate

Mazarek (Serbian: Мазарек; fl. 1414–23) was an Albanian nobleman and general in the service of the Serbian Despotate, with the title of vojvoda. At the beginning of the 15th century he was the governor of Rudnik and Ostrvica in Serbia. He was one of the commanders of Serbian troops during the Second Scutari War (1419–23) between Serbia and Venice. After death of Balša III in 1421 Mazarek was appointed the governor of Zeta.

== Life ==
Mazarek was Albanian (Arbanas). In 1414 Mazarek was recorded as governor of Rudnik and Ostrvica in the Serbian Despotate.

In August 1421 Serbian Despot Stefan Lazarević appointed vojvoda Mazarek to administer his possessions in Zeta. The nobility of Bar were then invited to a meeting in the cathedral of St. George where they recognized the suzerainty of the Serbian despot, while Mazarek recognized their right to govern the city according to their own legislations.

During the Second Scutari War (1419–23) between Serbia and Venice, Mazarek was one of the commanders of Serbian troops. At the end of 1421 the truce was signed and lasted until May 1422. Despot Stefan did not continue the war immediately after the truce because he was busy with other activities, while Mazarek undertook actions to prevent Venetian reinforcement of the Scutari garrison. He erected several fortresses on the right bank of river Bojana from where he controlled the river. When Venetian captain Niccolo Capello was sent to transport food supplies and archers to the besieged Scutari using three galleys, Mazarek's forces on the Bojana forced the galleys to retreat to the Adriatic Sea. In July 1422, the Venetian Senate ordered Niccolo Capello to return to Bojana and complete his mission, but he decided to wait for two galleys of provveditore and supracomite Marco Bembo and Marco Barbo carrying soldiers and material for destruction of the fortress Mazarek had erected in Shirgj. In November 1422 the Venetian fleet destroyed Mazarek's fortresses on the Bojana and reached Sveti Srđ. Due to low water level they could not continue their voyage through Bojana. In 1422, another vojvoda of the despot, Logosit, is mentioned as fighting in Kotor. Mazarek is mentioned in October 1423 in Ragusan documents.

== Sources ==
- Božić, Ivan (1979). Nemirno pomorje XV veka (in Serbian). Belgrade: Srpska književna zadruga. OCLC 5845972.
- Društvo za nauku i umjetnost Crne Gore (1975). Glasnik. Vol. 2. Društvo za nauku i umjetnost Crne Gore. pp. 8, 9, 18.
