= Logosit =

Logosit (Serbian Cyrillic: Логосит; fl. 1422) was a Serbian nobleman who served Despot Stefan Lazarević (r. 1402–27), with the title of vojvoda (general). He was mentioned in 1422 as fighting in Kotor during the Second Scutari War (1419–26); he commanded a Serbian force that carried out a second attack on Venetian-held Kotor. The surroundings were said to have been devastated by him.
