= Humoj family =

Noble family from Albania

Humoj
- Noble house
- Country: Republic of Venice
- Founded: 1402
- Estates: region of Balec and Drisht (modern day Albania)
- Dissolution: 1479

The Humoj or Omoj was an Albanian noble family that served as pronoiars of the Republic of Venice in the region of Balec and Drisht (modern day Albania) in the 15th century.

== Family history ==
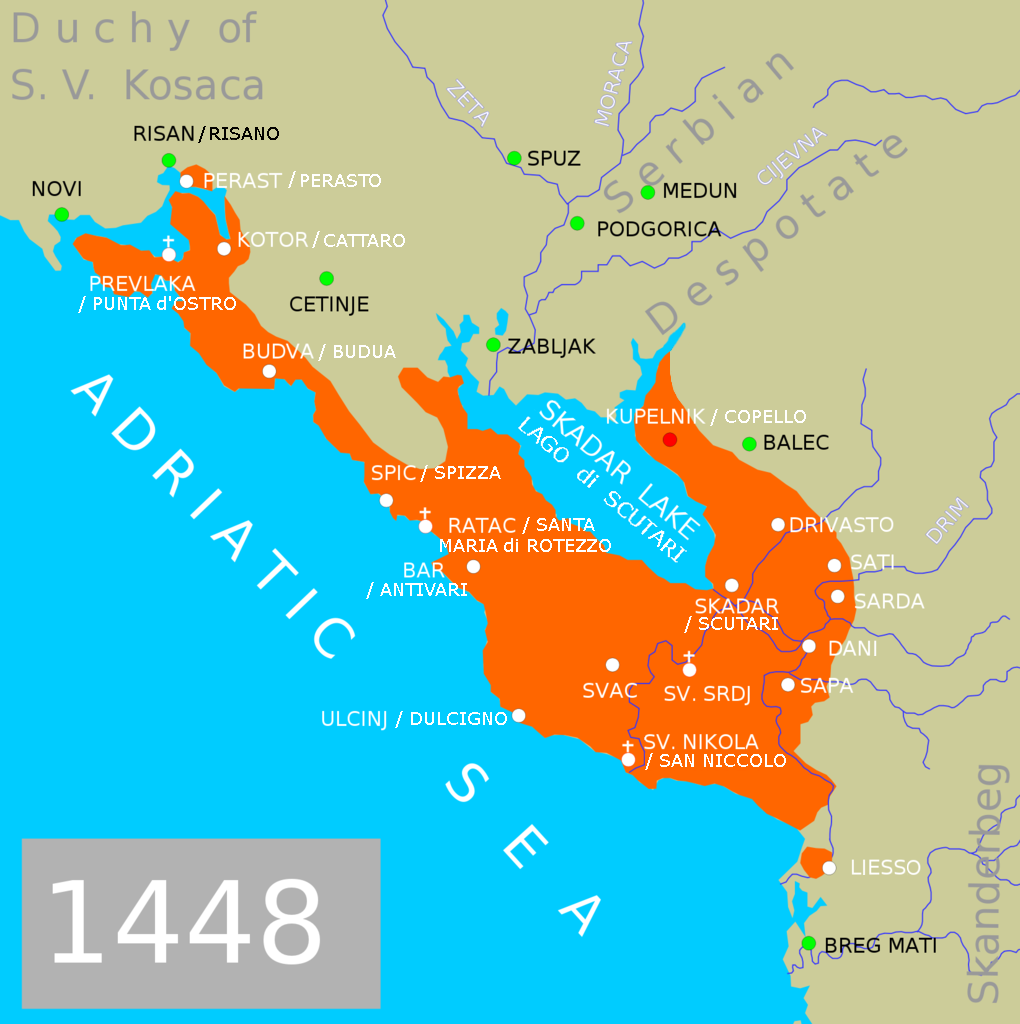
Position of Balec and Drisht in 1448

When Balec came under control of the Republic of Venice it became a pronoia of Radiq I Humoj who later controlled the fortress of Petra in the region of Polat. According to the Venetian reports, Radiq Humoj was a prominent pronoier in the region of Scutari in July 1403. Donato de Porto, a governor of Scutari, appointed Radiq as pronoier of Balec in period 1402—1403 and Senate confirmed his decision on 16 September 1404.

Radiq Humoj, like many other local Venetian pronoiers, supported Balša III during his war with the Venetian Republic in order to save his position and property. Balša III had some initial success at the beginning of 1405 and captured the whole Scutari region except the Scutari fortress itself. The Venetians managed to recapture Scutari region in the second half of 1405 and to take control over former Radiq's possessions. Although Radiq Humoj again pledged loyalty to Venice, they refused to return to him his previous pronoias. Only after Radiq had been killed while fighting for Venice and after the governor of Scutari informed the Senate about his merits, the Venetian Senate decided on 19 September 1410 to appoint Radiq's sons on his earlier position.

After Radiq's death, the Venetians gave Balec to his brother Andreas (who was then voivoda of the area north of the Shkoder) and his son Kojaçin. This was confirmed by the Venetian Senate on 13 February 1419. During the Second Scutari War, Andrea Humoj joined the Serbian despot while other members of the Humoj family remained loyal to the Venetians.

Kojaçin Humoj was married to a daughter of Zuan Anglezi, a Venetian officer in the fortress of Shkodër, and they had two sons, Radiq II (Radiq II Humoj) and Marin. Radiq II Humoj married a daughter of Peter Spani in 1433 and became pronoier of the village Serel in Bar district. When Kojaçin died, Venice gave his pronoia to somebody else and promised to the young Radiq II Humoj in November 1441 to give him some pronoia as soon as the pronoier in charge would have died. Since 1441, Radiq and Marin were pronoiers of Gleros near Shkoder, which once belonged to the Bonzi.

When Radiq Humoj rebelled against the Venetians, Peter Spani requested the Venetian Senate to give him control over Radiq's fortress Petra.

In 1443 Michael Humoj and his three brothers were pronoiars of the village with four houses, Passo Bianco in Drisht. When Passo Bianco became object of dispute among the Humoj brothers, the Venetian Senate decided in 1445 that only Michael would have remained pronoiar of that village.

== Struggle against Skanderbeg ==
Andrea and Kojaçin Humoj, together with Simeon Vulkata, led the pro-Venetian alliance against Skanderbeg, fighting particularly fiercely for the control over Balec and Drisht in 1447. Members of many local families participated in war on the Venetian side. These were Vasilije Ugrin, Zapa family (Jovan and his brother), Pedantari family (seven Pedantari brothers and many other), Moneta family (three sons of Rajko Moneta), Malonshi family (Petar with his two sons), Buša Sornja from Dagnum and many others. Koja Humoj was killed during a charge on Sati.

== Struggle against the Ottoman Empire ==
Between 1456 and August 1457 a small war was waged between two branches of the Dukagjini family between Ottoman-supported Lekë and Pal Dukagjini on one side and Draga Dukagjini, son of Nicholas Dukagjini, supported by Venice. In this war, the Humoj family, together with Skanderbeg and the Moneta family fought on the side of Venetian forces.

Andrea Humoj travelled to Venice in 1464 to affirm his family's claims in front of the Venetian Senate emphasizing the deeds of his ancestors. He again visited Venice in 1472 and during the Siege of Shkodra in 1474 when all of the Humoj ownership titles were confirmed once more. The members of the Humoj family did not enjoy their confirmed positions for long because many of them, like many members of the Moneta family, died fighting against the Ottoman Empire until the Ottomans captured Shkodër in 1479. Among them were Koja, Tanush, Duka, Michael and Piero Humoj. In January 1478, before the siege had started, the wife of Koja Humoj and their daughter went to Venice together with the wives and children of many other noblemen from Scutari, including the wife of Rajko Moneta and five children. When Andreas Humoj committed treason, he was sentenced to death by the Venetian commander-in-chief Triadan Gritti and executed by a man from Tuzi.

After the Republic of Venice and the Ottoman Empire signed the Treaty of Constantinople which ceded Shkodra to the Ottoman Empire, the members of the Humoj family, together with many of the citizens of Shkoder, emigrated to Italy.

== Humoj family in literature ==
Marin Barleti mentions Blasius Humoj as a knight in Shkodër in his work The Siege of Shkodra (Latin: De obsidione Scodrensi, Venice, 1504). Girolamo de Rada mentions Cola Humoj as one of the knights fighting in the Siege of Shkoder along with Milosao, the prince of Shkodra.

== Members ==
- Radiq (Radicius), pronijar
- Andrea, pronijar
- Kojaçin (Coiacin), pronijar
- Radiq II
- Marin
- Mihailo, pronijar
- Piero

Radiq and Andrea were brothers. Kojaçin was the son of Radica.

== Annotations ==
- Humoy, Humoja, Omoy, Moia

== Sources ==
- Serbian Academy of Science (1980), Glas, Volumes 319-323 (in Serbian), Belgrade: Serbian Academy of Science and Arts
- Schmitt, Oliver Jens (2001), Das venezianische Albanien (1392-1479), München: R. Oldenbourg Verlag GmbH München, ISBN 3-486-56569--9
