= Ostrvica Fortress =

Town built on Rudnik mountain, Serbia

Ostrvica
- Острвица
- Part of a system of castles functioning together to protect the mines of Rudnik
- Rudnik, Serbia
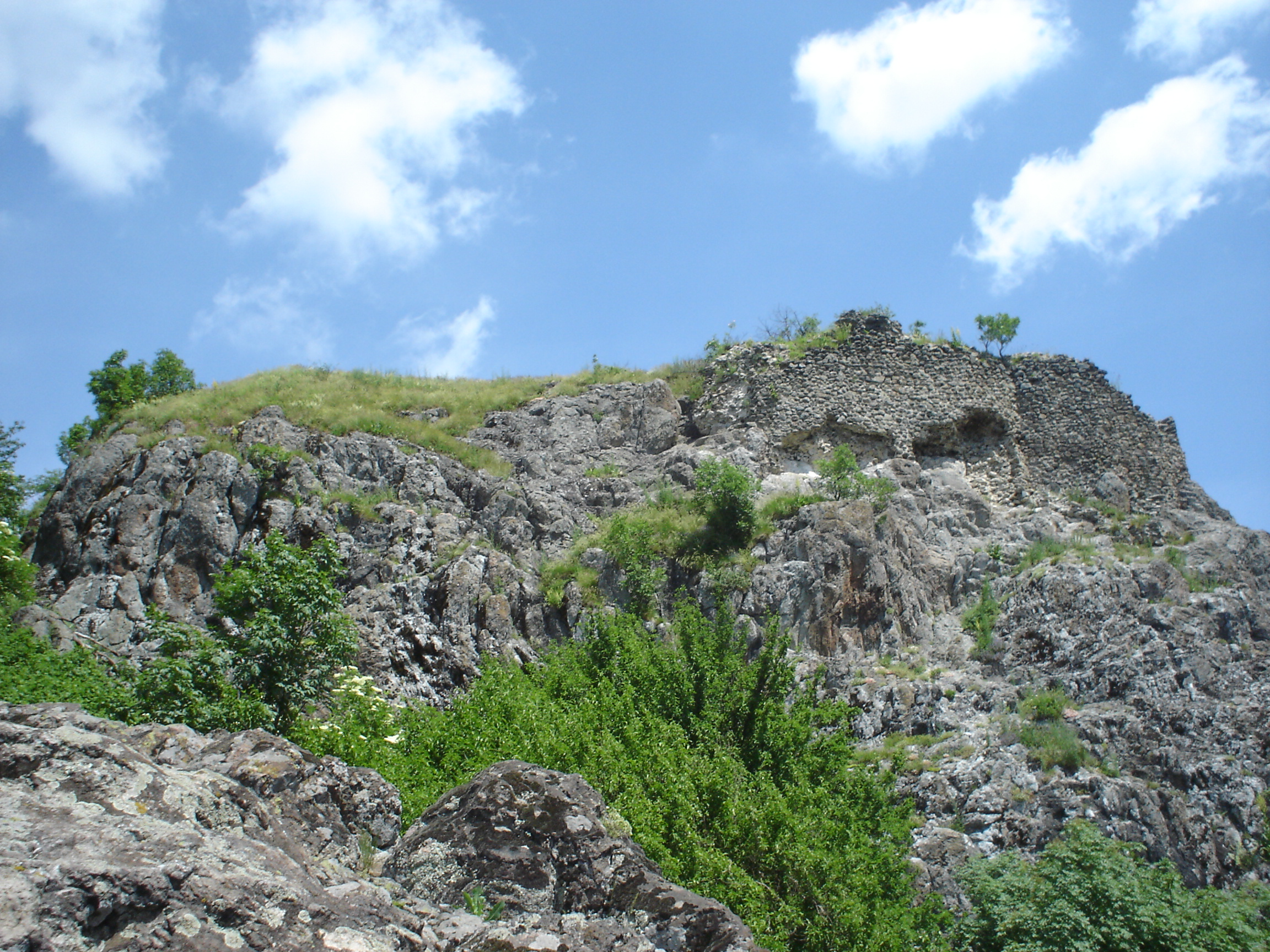
- Remnants of Ostrvica castle

Site information
- Controlled by: Kingdom of Serbia; Serbian Empire; Moravian Serbia; Serbian Despotate; Ottoman Empire
- Condition: ruined

Location
- Coordinates: 44°10′09″N 20°27′39″E

Site history
- Built: before 1323
- In use: 14th and 15th century
- Demolished: 1451

Garrison information
- Past commanders: Nikola Zojić in 1398; voivode Mazarek in 1414

Ostrvica or Ostrovica (Turkish: Sivrice Hisar) was a small fortified town built on one of the peaks of Rudnik mountain, 4 kilometres (2.5 mi) northwest of the town of Rudnik. After 1323/1324, when it was recorded for the first time, it belonged to the Kingdom of Serbia, Serbian Empire, Moravian Serbia, Serbian Despotate and Ottoman Empire. In 1451 the Ottomans razed it to the ground.

== Location ==
Ostrvica was the main castle in the Rudnik area. It is assumed that its location protected the mines of Rudnik from the north, while another castle (of Pavle Orlović) provided protection from the south. The two castles maintained visual communication by signals.

== History ==
During the 14th and 15th centuries the people of the region and merchants from Dubrovnik used Ostrovica castle as a haven during wars, first in 1323–1324 during the war between Stefan Dečanski and Stephen Vladislav. In 1398 Nikola Zojić , a governor of Ostrovica, retreated to Ostrvica after the failure of his attempt to overthrow Stefan Lazarević and to establish direct vassalage to the Ottoman Empire. Zojić took monastic vows to avoid the death penalty. In 1414 voivode Mazarek is mentioned as a governor of Ostrvica and Rudnik.

Ostrvica was captured by the Ottomans several times, first in 1431 and again in 1438. The Serbian despot recaptured it in 1443 during the Crusade of Varna, but the Ottomans captured it again in 1444, only to be restored to Serbia later in the year. Branković and Eirene used Ostrovica as their summer retreat, and had a mint in the castle.

When the Ottomans captured Ostrvica in 1451 they razed it to the ground. This was against the order of Murad II.

Evliya Çelebi described Ostrovica as the "town of Rudnik". He explained that it was founded by the Serbian King Miloš, captured by Ottomans, recaptured by Christians to be captured again by the Ottomans on 19 May 1521.

== See also ==
- Konstantin Mihailović
- List of fortifications in Serbia
