= Leonardo Boldù =

Leonardo Boldù was a member of the patrician Boldù family, who served the Republic of Venice as governor in Albania and ambassador to the Ottoman Empire during the First Ottoman–Venetian War. Boldu was one of the few Venetians of his era to learn Greek.

== Life ==
Leonardo Boldù' was born in 1420 to Pietro Boldù' and Franceschina Pozzo, the daughter of Vinciguerra Pozzo. Boldù' was presented to the Balla d'Oro in 1439. In 1450 he married a daughter of Conforto Morosini. Boldù' married again in 1460 to Fiordelize, the daughter of Conte Rainaldo da Collalto.

== Career ==
Leonardo Boldù' was elected Avogador omnes curias in 1446. He was elected to the Council of Forty in 1451. Leonardo Boldù'was Capo contrata San Samuele in 1455. In 1455, Leonardo Boldù' was appointed ambassador to the court of the Ottoman Empire. He was elected Auditor Veteris in 1458.

Boldù' was appointed Captain and Proveditore to Salò and Province of Brescia in 1461. In 1465, Boldù was elected Rector of Scutari (Shkoder).

In October 1467, as Rector of Scutari, he was entrusted with a diplomatic mission as ambassador to Sultan Mehmed II in an attempt to end the ongoing First Ottoman–Venetian War. Granted safe-passage to the Ottoman court through the intercession of the Albanian nobleman Alessio Spani and bearing rich gifts for the Sultan, Boldù managed to meet Mehmed in March 1468, but his mission failed to achieve anything substantial.

In 1470, Boldù succeeded his friend, Giosafat Barbaro as Conte, Capitano and Proevveditor of Scutari.

Boldù was elected Savio agli Ordini in 1471 and Proweditore of all Albania 1473. In May 1474, Boldù was appointed overall governor (provveditore) of Venetian possessions in northwestern Albania, which faced an Ottoman attack that culminated in a failed siege of Scutari.

Boldù was elected Proveditore of Lombardy 1476. In 1476, Boldù was one of the 41 senators chosen to act as electors, who selected Andrea Vendramin as Doge.

== Sources ==
- Babinger, Franz (1961). Johannes Darius (1414 - 1491), Sachwalter Venedigs im Morgenland, und sein griechischer Umkreis (in German). Munich: Verlag der Bayerischen Akademie der Wissenschaften. OCLC 54905371.
- Babinger, Franz (1992) [1978]. Mehmed the Conqueror and His Time. Bollingen Series 96. Translated from the German by Ralph Manheim. Edited, with a preface, by William C. Hickman. Princeton, New Jersey: Princeton University Press. ISBN 0-691-09900-6. OCLC 716361786.
- Beverley, Tessa (1999). "Venetian ambassadors 1454-94: an Italian elite" (PDF). University of Warwick, Department of History.
- Lockhart, Laurence; Morozzo della Rocca, Raimondo; Tiepolo, Maria Francesca (1973). I Viaggi in Persia degli ambasciatori veneti Barbaro e Contarini. Istituto poligrafico dello Stato, Libreria.
