= Siege of Shkodra =

Battle during the First Ottoman-Venetian War

Siege of Shkodra Rrethimi i Shkodrës
- Part of the Ottoman–Venetian War (1463–1479) and Albanian–Ottoman Wars (1432–1479)
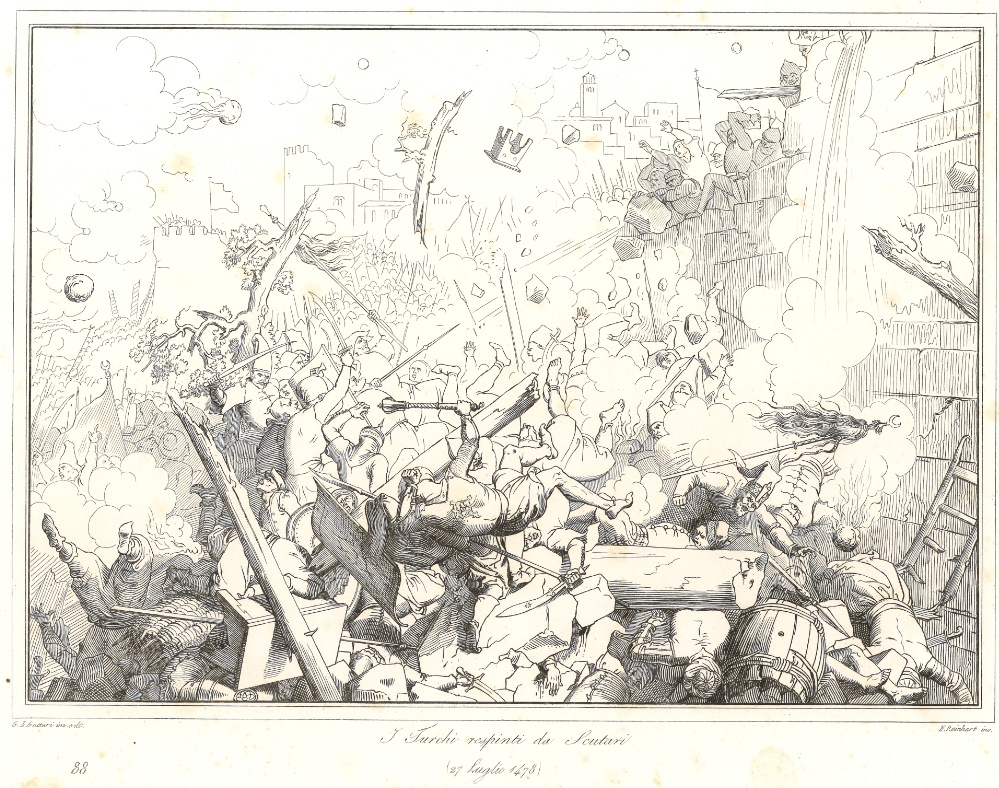
- Gatteri's 1860 etching of the 1478 siege
Date	May 1478 – 25 April 1479
Location	Shkodër, Albania Veneta 42°02′47″N 19°29′37″E
Result	Ottoman victory: Treaty of Constantinople (1479)
Territorial changes	Shkodër was ceded to the Ottoman Empire

Belligerents
Ottoman Empire	Republic of Venice; League of Lezhë and other Albanian resistance forces Lordship of Zeta

Commanders and leaders
Mehmed II; Koca Davud Pasha; Mustafa Bey; Gedik Ahmed Pasha; Mihaloğlu Ali Bey	Antonio Da Lézze; Nicholas Moneta; Friar Bartholomew; Ivan Crnojević

Strength
Modern estimations: 62,000; Contemporary Ottoman and Shkodran chronicles: 150,000–350,000 soldiers 8,000–40,000 under Gedik Ahmet after sultan left the siege in September 1478	1,600 inside the garrison Unknown number of forces outside the garrison 8,000 Albanian warriors

Casualties and losses
At least 12,000 on July 22; Allegedly one-third of the Ottoman forces on July 27	Approximately 1,000 inside the garrison 200 sailors and 2 galleys from Lezhë; 300 captives from Drisht

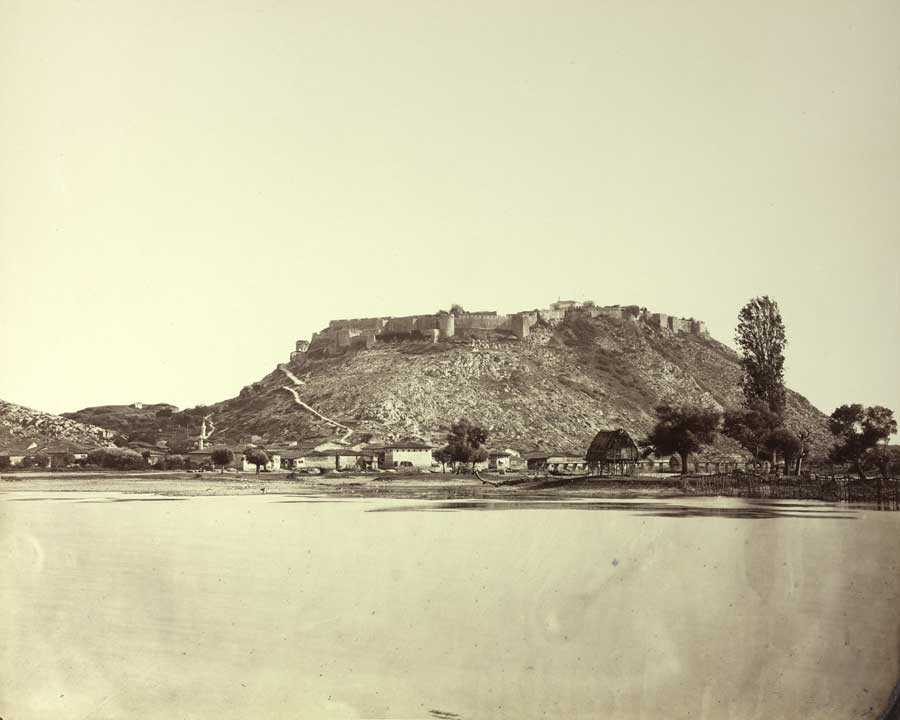
Object of the siege: an ancient Albanian citadel on the Buna River

The siege of Shkodra (Albanian: Rrethimi i Shkodrës) took place from May 1478 to April 1479 as a confrontation between the Ottoman Empire and the Venetians together with the League of Lezhë and other Albanians at Shkodra (Scutari in Italian) and its Rozafa Castle during the First Ottoman-Venetian War (1463–1479). Ottoman historian Franz Babinger called the siege "one of the most remarkable episodes in the struggle between the West and the Crescent".

A small force of approximately 1,600 Albanian and Italian men and a much smaller number of women faced a massive Ottoman force containing artillery cast on site and an army reported (though widely disputed) to have been as many as 350,000 in number. The campaign was so important to Mehmed the Conqueror that he came personally to ensure triumph. After nineteen days of bombarding the castle walls, the Ottomans launched five successive general attacks which all ended in victory for the besieged. With dwindling resources, Mehmed attacked and defeated the smaller surrounding fortresses of Žabljak Crnojevića, Drisht, and Lezha, left a siege force to starve Shkodra into surrender, and returned to Constantinople. On January 25, 1479, Venice and Constantinople signed a peace agreement that among other concessions ceded Shkodra to the Ottoman Empire. The defenders of the citadel emigrated to Venice, whereas many Albanians from the region retreated into the mountains. Shkodra then became a seat of the newly established Ottoman sanjak, the Sanjak of Scutari. The Ottomans held the city until Montenegro captured it in April 1913, after a six-month siege.

== Background ==
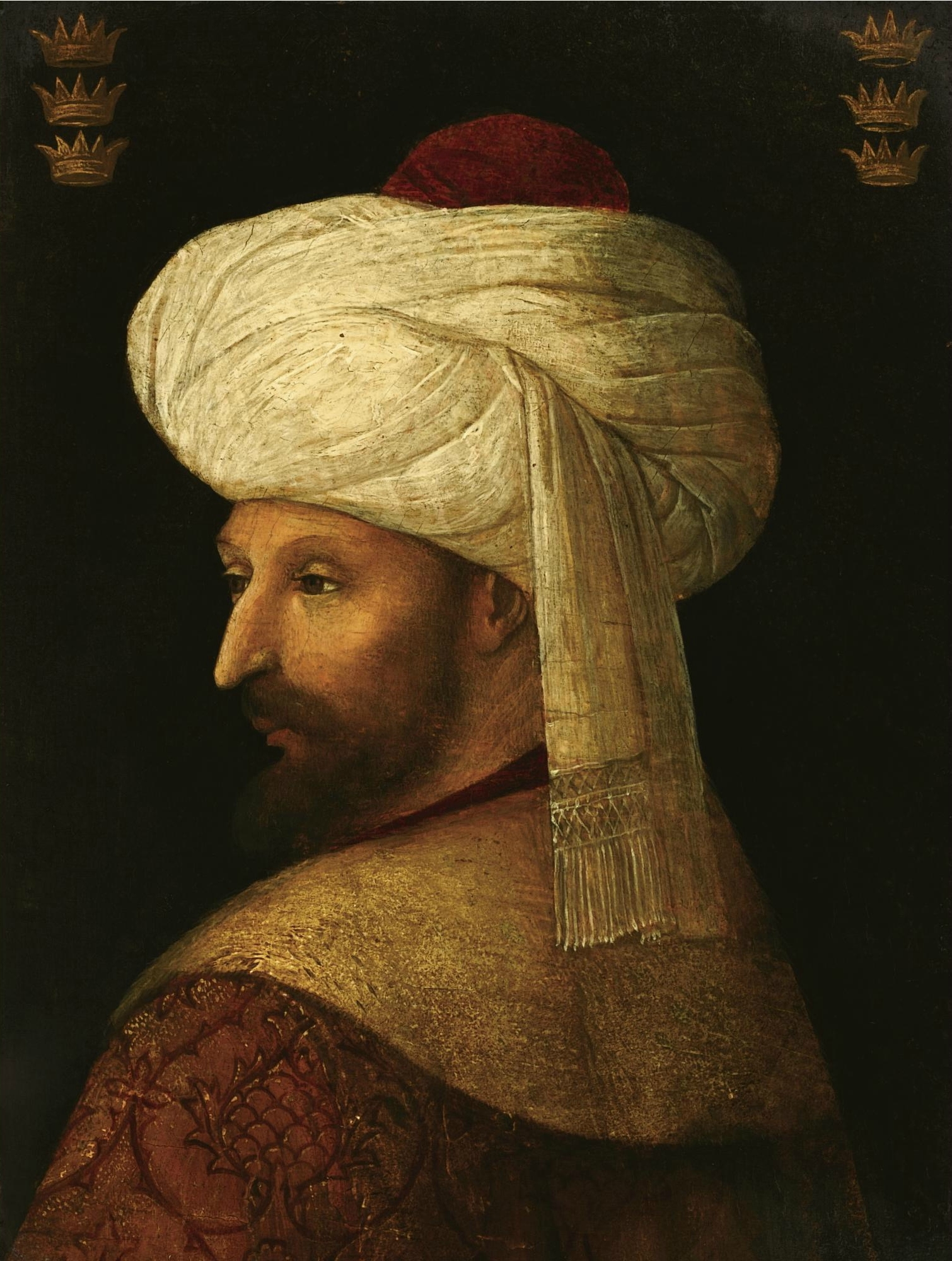
Sultan Mehmed II went personally to lead the siege

Shkodra, also known as Shkodër or as Scutari, was both a strategic town and an important region of Albania Veneta. After being held by the Balšić noble family since 1355, Shkodra was briefly taken by the Ottomans in 1393, retaken by Đurađ II Balšić in 1395, then ceded (along with the nearby fortresses of Drivast, Dagnum, and Šas) to the Republic of Venice in 1405.

Sultan Mehmed II had already conquered Constantinople in 1453, but now desired to dominate the Albanian coastline and be better poised to cross the Adriatic and march upon Rome. Scanderbeg had thwarted Ottoman success in Albania for a quarter of a century; his League of Lezha, a united front of Albanian forces which was formed in 1444 to resist the Ottomans, had collapsed in 1468. Scanderbeg died in 1468; nevertheless, Kruja and some northern Albanian garrisons were still holding with Venetian support.

The Venetians and the Ottoman Empire had been at war since 1463, the Ottoman Empire seeking expansion and the Venetians seeking to secure their trading colonies. Venice held and was arming a number of Albanian towns, including Shkodra, which it had taken in 1396 and renamed Scutari. By 1466 Venice considered Shkodra the heart and capital of Albania Veneta.

Shkodra was so important to the Empire's aims that, shortly after the siege, Ottoman chronicler Ashik Pashazade called it "the hope of passage to the lands of Italy". The Ottomans attempted to take Shkodra in the siege of 1474. Sultan Mehmed II's commander Suleiman Pasha failed; therefore the Ottomans retreated and the sultan planned a more powerful offensive.

Meanwhile, Mehmed II had demanded that Venice surrender Kruja, Shkodra, and other Albanian towns in exchange for peace, and added leverage to this demand by instructing Iskender Bey, the sanjak bey of Bosnia to invade Friuli. Count Carlo da Braccio repulsed the invaders, but before returning to Bosnia, "the Turkish bands nevertheless did enormous damage and carried away large numbers of men and cattle." Despite these losses, Venice refused to yield to Mehmed II's demands to surrender Shkodra, being its "last bastion in the East". In 1477 the Ottomans captured most of the nearby territory of Zeta together with Žabljak and defeated the main army of Ivan Crnojević late in 1477 or early 1478. Crnojević soon recovered Žabljak but held it only briefly while the Ottomans concentrated on their attack on Shkodra. Among the population of Shkodra there were people who were suspected to be connected to the Ottomans and who supported the surrender of the city.

== Forces involved ==
The Republic of Venice was intent on defending Shkodra. Expecting the new Ottoman attack, the Venetians prepared vigorously, sending their expert engineers to reinforce the fortifications according to the most modern techniques and maintaining a garrison of about 800 mercenaries in the city. In late 1477, as the new Ottoman threat grew imminent, many Venetian mercenaries deserted Shkodra. Therefore, the Venetian Senate finally approved the locals' requests for arms and gave permission for the recruitment of warriors from the surrounding villages. The city of Shkodra would be defended by its strong walls and a mixed garrison of locals and the remaining Venetian mercenaries.

In the spring of 1478, Mehmed II dispatched both the beylerbey of Rumelia, Koca Davud Pasha, and the new beylerbey of Anatolia, Mustafa Bey, to Shkodra with the armies under their control. In his eyewitness testimony (book), The Siege of Shkodra, Shkodran historian Marin Barleti recorded that there may have been up to 350,000 Ottoman soldiers involved in the attack. Ottoman chronicler Kivami wrote of 100,000 Ottoman soldiers in one attack alone. Venice wanted to aid the besieged and sent their galleys up the Bojana River from the Adriatic Sea, but they were prevented by an Ottoman blockade at Shirgj.

When the Ottomans approached Shkodra in May 1478, Venetian commander Antonio da Lézze sent the women and children to the seaside villages, but some women stayed behind to help the men. Approximately 2,000 people defended the castle from within, whereas hundreds of Albanian men and youths from the region helped from without, making guerilla attacks on the Ottoman tent camps. Forces of Ivan Crnojević, with Ragusan support, sailed over the lake and attacked Ottoman tents at night. Other notable figures in the defense of Shkodra were Friar Bartholomew of Epirus, who had fought alongside Scanderbeg before taking holy orders and gave rousing speeches to rally the defenders, and Nicholas Moneta.

== Rozafa Fortress and the siege ==
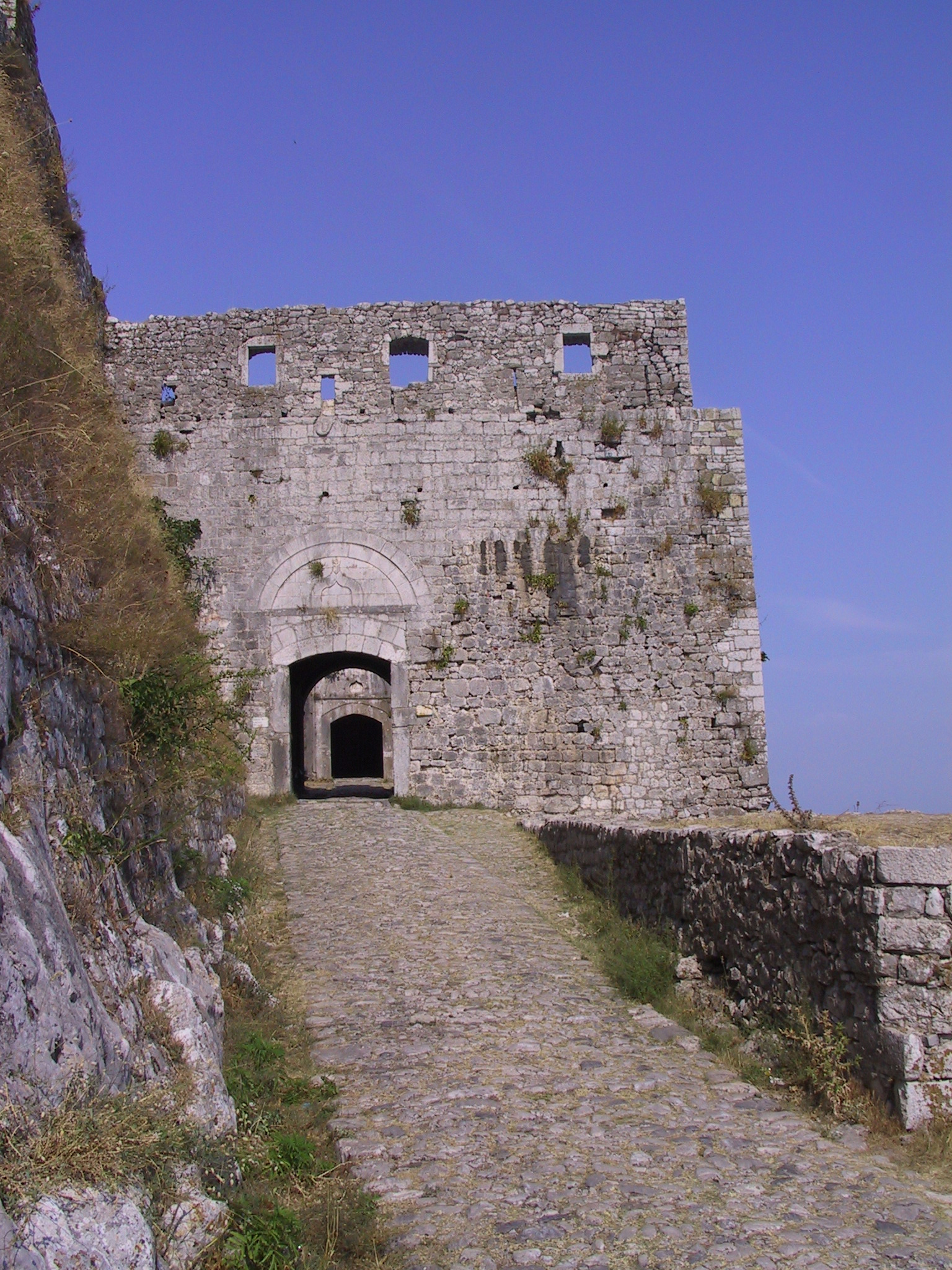
Venetian gate (outer), barbican, and original Illyrian gate (inner) at the northern face of the fortress

The Rozafa Fortress was the focal point of the siege, the natural position and architectural reinforcements of which allowed the vastly outnumbered garrison to withstand bombardment and successive ground attacks by the besiegers. The castle (as it is sometimes called) was considered the central leg of a trivet (or tripod) including Zabljak, Drisht, and Lezhë. The city of Shkodra had been burned and rampaged by the Turks in 1467, so from that time the citizens had moved into the fortress for greater security.

The fortress was a natural bastion above Lake Shkodra, three rivers (Bojana, Drin, and Kir), and the Adriatic Sea; it was esteemed to have been "a kind of Thermopylae where the high mountains narrowed the passage between the lake and the sea". All faces of the fortress mount were recorded as being steep, but the northern face was least steep and more easily climbed. Ottoman chroniclers reported the difficulties of ascending the fortress mount.

Foreseeing siege warfare, in 1458, Venetian architects Andrea and Francesco Venier and Malchiore da Imola drew plans for the citadel's reinforcements and a cistern system designed to collect rain water. Additionally, the Venetians added a barbican and extra gate to reinforce what they (correctly) forecast to be the main point of conflict. In the failed Ottoman siege of 1474, the outer walls were damaged significantly. According to Barleti's firsthand account, the citizens rebuilt the walls, but when they sensed that the Ottomans were approaching again with an even stronger attack, they constructed secondary fortifications and redoubts made of wood and earth.

== Siege ==
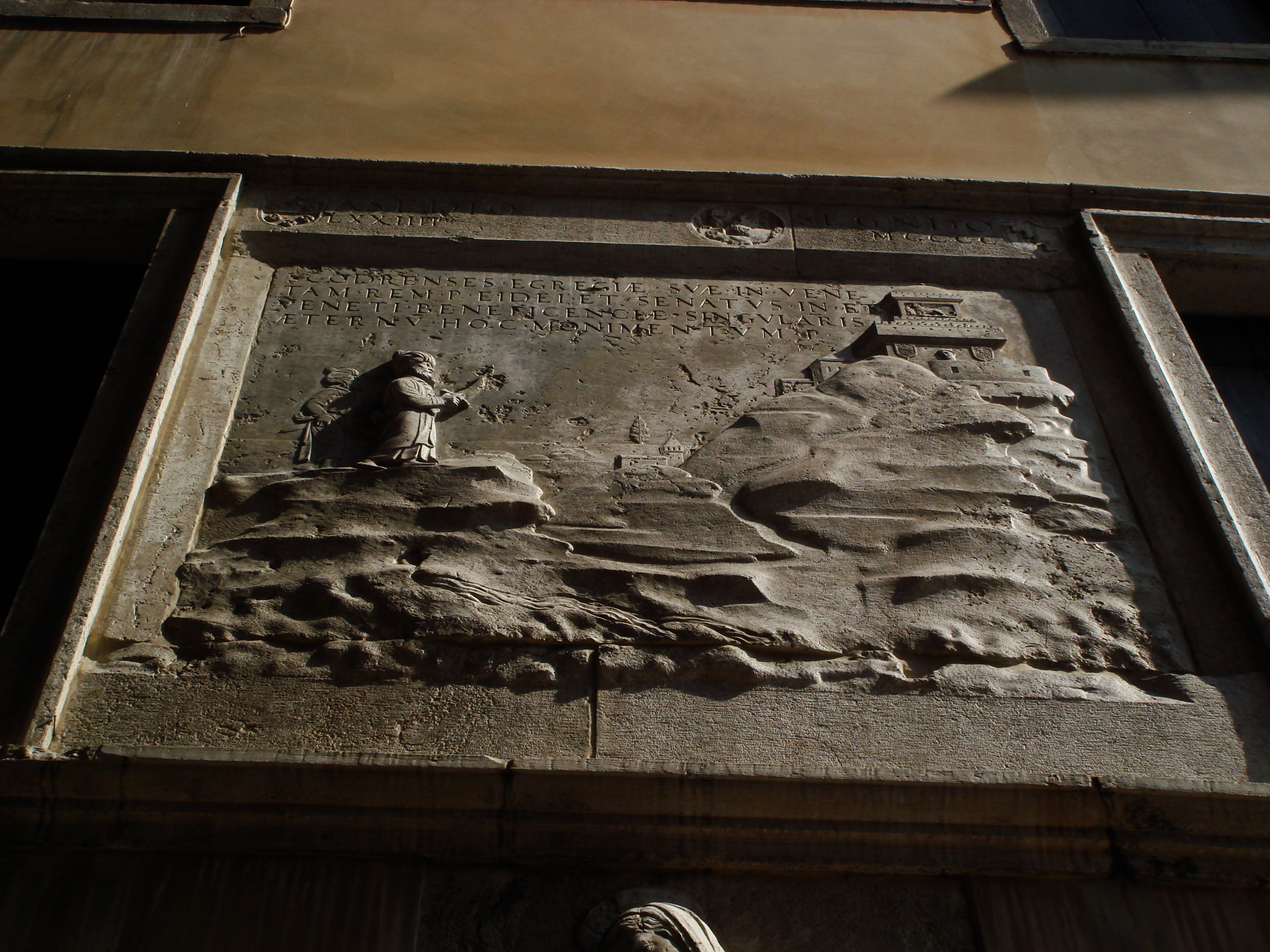
A relief commemorating the siege from the 15th century School of the Albanians in Venice

In the Spring of 1478, Mehmed II sent out advance scouts and then his commanders to march on Shkodra, inducing panic across the countryside. On May 14, the first soldiers arrived in Shkodra: 8,000 Ottoman akinci led by Ali Bey, 4,000 horsemen led by Iskender Bey, and 3,000 horsemen led by Malkoch (Malkoçoğlu). The citizens intensified their work to fortify the citadel, adding secondary defenses in anticipation of seeing the outer walls demolished by the Ottoman cannonade. The Ottomans set fire to surrounding villages and many citizens of the Shkodra region fled to safer haven.

Five days later, the pasha of Rumelia, Davud Pasha, arrived and set up camp on the hill due north of the castle, known as "Pasha's Hill," where much of the Ottoman cannonade would be positioned (at approximately the same altitude as the fortress). The defenders were stationed on all sides but concentrated their resources on the main gate area where the Ottomans focused their attack.

Around June 5, Davud Pasha climbed St. Mark's Mountain (today's Mt. Tarabosh, opposite the castle to the west) to survey the positions and strategize. Several days later, the pasha of Anatolia (Mustafa Bey) arrived bringing approximately 46,000 cavalry. On June 15, about 5,000 of the sultan's janissaries came to prepare for Mehmed II's arrival on July 1. Mehmed was in Kruja to conclude a year-long siege. Those in Kruja, dying of hunger, were given the choice of staying and submitting to Ottoman rule or withdrawing safely with their possessions. They chose the latter, but instead were "mercilessly beheaded". By June 16, 1478, Kruja was finally under Ottoman control.

Ottoman soldiers continued to flow into Shkodra throughout the latter half of June. Around June 18, a small delegation of Ottoman leaders demanded the Shkodrans surrender, offering peace and rewards if they chose to comply and threatening torture and execution if they chose to resist. On behalf of all the Shkodrans, Peter Pagnanus refused the offer with threats of his own.

On June 22, the first two Ottoman cannons were installed and began to fire on the city. By July 11, eleven cannons were being employed, as well as two mortars whose projectiles exploded upon impact. Babinger records artillery of enormous caliber and "incendiary rockets, balls of rags impregnated with wax, sulfur, oil, and other inflammable materials" being "used for the first time". The besieged also had cannons of their own. The Shkodran priest Marin Barleti recorded a daily tally of incoming cannon fire, with the total reaching over 3,200 shots. Von Hammer gives a figure of 2,534 total shots.

On July 11, the sultan launched the first of five ground attacks. The climb proved difficult for the Ottoman soldiers, who were repulsed in every attack. On July 27, the Ottomans launched their fifth and final assault. Shkodran Jacob Moneta roused his ailing troops with a thrilling speech. The sultan climbed Pasha's Hill to observe the battle. Determined to triumph, the sultan ordered heavy artillery fire simultaneous to the ground assault, resulting in at least three instances of devastating "friendly fire" upon the Ottomans. Incredibly, the Shkodran garrison held yet again. Barleti records that the arrows fired by the Ottoman archers were so copious that the Shkodrans used them for kindling to start fires—and needed no other kindling for an entire month. The Venetian historian Sabellicus reported anecdotal accounts from eyewitnesses inside the castle, such as: "a miserable cat, scared from her hiding place by the war-cries, fell pierced by eleven [arrow] shafts at once"

On July 30, the sultan gathered his general council desiring to plan a sixth ground attack, but was persuaded to halt attacks on the Shkodrans who, according to Ottoman historian Kivami, were fighting "like tigers on the mountaintops". The sultan accepted this counsel at the end of August and ordered his commanders to attack the smaller fortresses nearby who were aiding Shkodra. Žabljak, "where Ivan Crnojevic (1465–1490), 'lord of the Zeta,' had established his court, surrendered to the governor of Rumelia almost without a blow (not by Crnojević but by his cousin and small number of men). Drisht, however, ... resisted bravely," but the Ottomans captured it easily on 1 September 1478, using their artillery. 300 captives from Drisht were taken to Shkodra and executed in the sight of the besieged. Then the Ottomans marched on Lezhë but found it nearly completely abandoned; on the Drin River they captured two Venetian galleys with 200 sailors, who were taken near the walls of Shkodra and killed in front of the people of Shkodra. Mehmed II ordered bridges to be built on the Bojana River to prevent Venetian ships from coming to Shkodra's aid via the Adriatic Sea. He ordered a siege force to remain in Shkodra—led by Gedik Ahmed Pasha and said to have contained between 10,000 and 40,000 soldiers—to starve the city into surrender. Then, "disappointed at the outcome of his Albanian campaign, Mehmed started the return journey" to Constantinople, "with 40,000 men".

== Conclusion ==
In November 1478, as the siege wore on and as the besieged had resorted to eating mice and rats, Antonio Da Lézze (the proveditore of the city) continued to appeal for help to the Signoria of Venice, which decided to send forces to lift the siege; four days later, however, the decision was reversed. On January 25, 1479, the Republic of Venice and the Ottoman Empire signed the Treaty of Constantinople which ceded Shkodra to Mehmed II on the condition that the citizens be spared. Venice did not include its ally Ivan Crnojević in this peace treaty; therefore Crnojević was forced to leave Zeta and find a haven in Italy. The treaty was ratified in Venice on April 25, 1479. The Shkodrans in the castle had to choose between emigrating to Venice or dwelling under the rule of their enemies. Marin Barleti records that every citizen chose emigration. Babinger records that, after the 1479 peace treaty, the old Albanian families "such as the Arianiti, the Dukagjins, the Castriotas, the Musachi, and the Topias were obliged to take refuge in Naples, Venice, or northern Italy". Many Albanians, however, did remain in their fatherland. Some espoused Islam and some retreated deeper into the mountains and organized occasional uprisings, maintaining a "rigorous resistance" against the Ottomans until well into the seventeenth century. Both the besieged and the besiegers acknowledged both victory and loss. The Shkodran garrison indeed withstood the military assault, but they eventually lost and left the city; whereas the Ottomans indeed gained the city, but only after failing to conquer it by military force and sustaining significant casualties.

== Casualties ==
Franz Babinger claims that the Ottomans lost "12,000 of their best troops" on the attack of July 22 alone, then describes a further one-third of the Ottoman army being lost on July 27; the Shkodran garrison is said to have lost 400 on July 22. Ottoman historian Kemal Pashazade (1468–1534) recorded that "hundreds of the infidels and Muslims died each day and hundreds more escaped with wounded heads … swollen with lumps and craters like the surface of the moon." Another Ottoman historian, Tursun (ca. 1426–1491), recorded "A great war unfolded and an unmerciful bloodshed that had never before been seen in history". Marin Barleti recorded thousands of Ottoman casualties and hundreds of Shkodran casualties. Albanian historian Aleks Buda, in his analysis of Venetian chronicles of the event, concludes that of the approximately 1,600 Shkodran men and women who fought in the citadel, approximately 450 men and 150 women survived.

== Significance ==
After the fall of Shkodra in 1479, the Ottomans effectively controlled the entire territory of Albania and could focus on advancing to Italy. Ottoman chronicler Ashik Pashazade (ca. 1400–1481) claimed "Shkodra has been conquered, a fortress near land and sea ... the hope of passage to Italy!" Indeed, the Ottomans would pass on to Italy in July, 1480, at the invasion of Otranto. So important was Albania to the Otranto invasion that Gedik Ahmet Pasha (the Ottoman army and navy commander) utilized it as a supply station and place of quick retreat. Goffman records a 1548 battle off the coast of Préveza in which an inferior Ottoman fleet led by Barbarossa routed Andrea Doria's Catholic galleys largely because of the fresh reinforcements coming from the Ottoman-controlled Albanian shores. Thirty-six of Doria's vessels were captured, whereas Barbarossa lost none.

In Shkodra and other parts of northern Albania, the Ottomans transformed churches into mosques and promoted conversion to Islam. According to the Albanologist Robert Elsie, an estimated thirty to fifty percent of the population of northern Albania eventually converted by the early seventeenth century. They "converted … mainly not for theological reasons, but primarily to have the right to bear weapons, to have access in the Ottoman state high ranks, to make career in the military and to avoid higher taxes". Franciscan missionary activity helped to stem this tide; nevertheless, conversions "continued unabated throughout the eighteenth and nineteenth centuries". According to Albanian historian and Osmanolog Dritan Egro many high ranking Ottoman Albanians would push other Albanian to convert in Islam in order to fill Ottoman ranks and create an Albanian pyramid of power inside the Empire. It is not a confidence that the 2 Pashas that were send to take Shkodra, Ghedik Pasha and Davut Pasha were both Albanian.

Shkodra became an administrative and military center known as a sanjak and it was one of the main Ottoman cities in the Balkans. The city became famous for its artisan weapon manufacturing by the locals for the Albanian mercenaries to use in battle or show as a sign of power.

In between the 1750s to 1830s the city was the centre of the semi-independent Pashalluk of Shkodra led by the powerful Albanian Bushati family who would expand its power in large areas of western Balkans.

In 1867 it merged with the sanjak of Skopje to form the Vilayet of Shkodra. In 1912, Albania declared independence from the Ottoman Empire, procuring the favor of the London Conference of Ambassadors.

== Art and literature ==
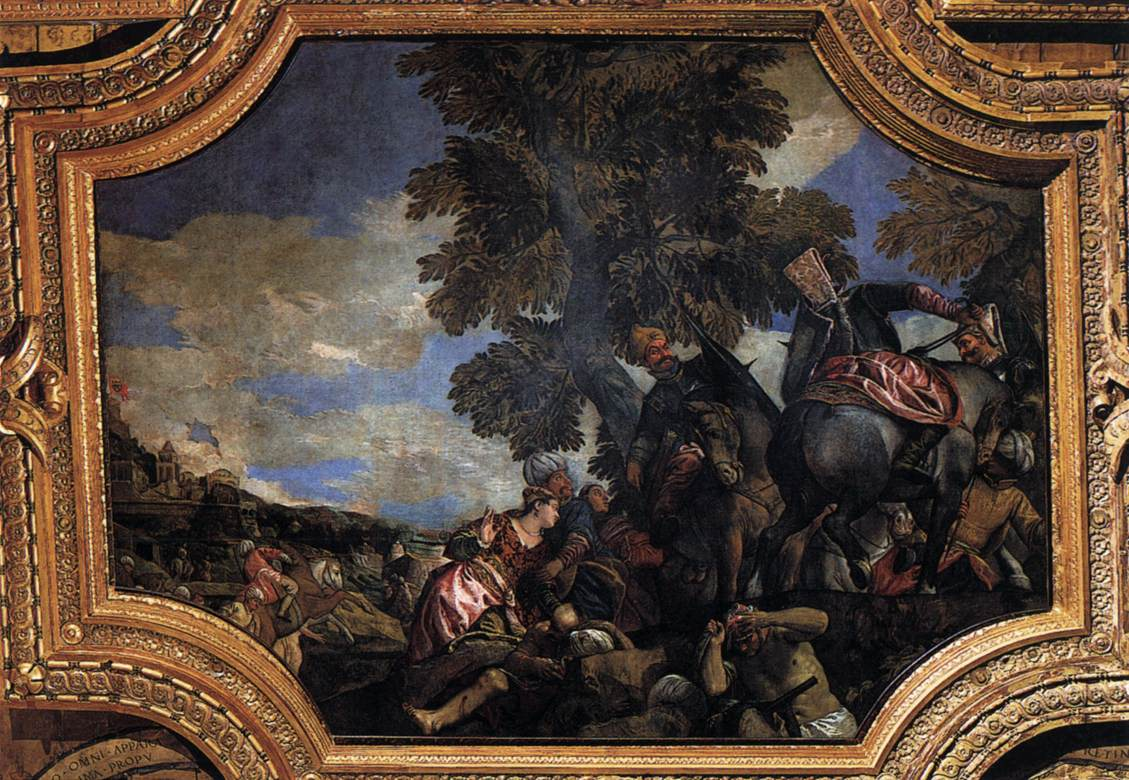
Veronese's Siege of Scutari depicting a noblewoman being taken captive

The siege of Shkodra is depicted in several works of European literature and art. The façade of the former School of the Albanians in Venice contains a relief created by an unknown sculptor and placed there in 1532 (it has been erroneously attributed to Vittore Carpaccio). Sultan Mehmed II is depicted with his Grand Vizier below a cliff on which the Rozafa Castle is perched. The hero commanders of both the 1474 and 1478 battles — Antonio Loredan and Antonio da Lézze—are honored by the inclusion of their coats-of-arms. The Latin inscription means: “The people of Shkodra put up this everlasting monument of their outstanding loyalty toward the Republic of Venice and of the Venetian Senate's extraordinary beneficence.”

In 1503, Marin Becikemi wrote and published a panegyric about the siege, in praise of the Republic of Venice.

In 1504, Marin Barleti's The Siege of Shkodra (De obsidione Scodrensi) was published in Venice. It is a firsthand account the siege presented to the Venetian Senate. It was republished several times and translated into other European languages in the sixteenth century (and later into Albanian and English). In 2018 Venetian scholar Lucia Nadin discovered a manuscript of Marin Barleti, dated ca. 1500, presumed to be the original manuscript of De obsidione Scodrensi (scholars have begun to study this manuscript).

In 1585, Paolo Veronese painted The Siege of Scutari, oil on canvas, which is located on the ceiling of the Doge's Palace in Venice.

In 1860, Giuseppe Lorenzo Gatteri depicted the great battle of July 27 with an etching entitled I Turchi respinti da Scutari.

== Primary sources ==
- Barletius, Marinus. De obsidione Scodrensi [The Siege of Shkodra]. Venice: B. de Vitalibus, 1504.
- Barleti, Marin (trans. David Hosaflook). The Siege of Shkodra. Tirana: Onufri Publishing House, 2012.
- A. Pashazade, Tursun, et al., in Pulaha, Selami (ed.). Lufta shqiptaro-turke në shekullin XV: Burime osmane [Albanian-Turkish Wars in the Fifteenth Century: Ottoman Sources] (a compendium of Ottoman chronicles including Kivami, Bidlisi, Tursun, A. Pashazade, K. Pashazade, etc., in both the original languages and Albanian translations). Tiranë: Universiteti Shtetëror i Tiranës, Instituti i Historisë dhe Gjuhësisë, 1968.
- Zamputi, Injac (ed.). Dokumenta të shekullit XV për historinë e Shqipërisë v. IV (1479-1506) [Documents of the Fifteenth Century about the History of Albania, v. IV (1479–1506)] (containing archival documents). Tiranë: Universiteti Shtetëror i Tiranës, Instituti i Historisë dhe Gjuhësisë, 1967.
