= Second Scutari War =

Military conflict

Second Scutari War Lufta e Dytë e Shkodrës
- Map of operations in 1421–1423, 1. Forces of Serbian Despotate, 2. Venetian forces
Date	March 1419 – August 1423
Location	Coast of the Lordship of Zeta
Result	Inconclusive, See aftermath
Territorial changes	Venice captured Ulcinj, Grbalj, and territory of Paštrovići, with Kotor deciding to accept Venetian suzerainty; Serbian Despotate captured Drivast and returned its suzerainty over Bar, Budva, and Luštica

Belligerents
Zeta (until 1421); Serbian Despotate (after 1421); Albanian nobility: Dukagjini family; Kastrioti family; Humoj family; Zaharia family	Republic of Venice

Commanders and leaders
Balša III; Stefan Lazarević; Mazarek; Đurađ Branković; Stanisha Kastrioti; Little Tanush (Dukagjini); Big Tanush (Dukagjini); Koja Zaharia; Andrija Humoj	Pietro Loredan; Francesco Bembo; Niccolo Capello

The Second Scutari War (Albanian: Lufta e Dytë e Shkodrës; Serbo-Croatian: Други скадарски рат) was an armed conflict in 1419–1426 between Zeta (1419–1421) and then the Serbian Despotate (1421–1423) on the one side and the Venetian Republic on the other, over Shkodër and other former possessions of Zeta captured by Venice.

== Background ==
The First Scutari War was waged in period 1405–1413 between Balša III and the Venetian Republic. In this war Balša III tried to capture Shkodër and its surrounding region which was given to the Venetians by his father Đurađ II Balšić in 1396. Using the anti-Venetian rebellion of the Shkodër population, Balša III managed to capture several nearby towns in 1405. The Venetians then convinced Balša's towns Budva, Bar, and Ulcinj to accept their suzerainty. After several years of battles and negotiations the war was ended in 1412 with treaty which obliged Balša III and Venice to return everything to the pre-war situation. Both parties were unsatisfied with the peace treaty and believed that the other party was in breach of the agreed terms and that the other party should pay more for the damage during the war.

== War ==
=== Between Zeta and Venice ===
In March 1419 Balša III again attempted to recapture Shkodër and its surrounding area. In May he managed to capture Drivast and in August 1419 its castle. The Venetians tried to bribe Kastriotis and Dukagjinis to fight against Zeta in 1419, but it seems without success. The Venetians also tried to win over some other prominent members of Albanian nobility who supported Balša III, like Koja Zaharia who was asked to recognize Venetian suzerainty over his Dagnum. Then they tried to win over the Hoti and Mataguži tribes.

=== Between the Serbian Despotate and Venice ===
Possession changes in Zeta

==== Capture of Drisht, Shirgj, and Bar ====
Lazarević and his Serbian Despotate had been ceded Lordship of Zeta from Balša III in April 1421, but the Venetians did not recognize him, holding on to the occupied Zetan coast and Bojana, including Drisht recaptured by them after Balša's death. Venetians emphasized to the despot's envoy that they had no intention to cede Balša's former possessions to the despot and even requested Ottoman support in case of the despot's attack. In August 1421, Lazarević led his army into Zeta. Gjon Kastrioti, who was a Serbian ally, reinforced Lazarević with troops led by one of his sons immediately upon the arrival of the latter in Zeta. According to Fan Noli it was Stanisha who was sent by his father, together with auxiliary forces, to help the Serbian despot to capture Shkodër from the Venetians. With their support, the despot immediately captured Shirgj and Drisht. Then he went to the coast and took Bar in the middle of November 1421.

Lazarević appointed Voivode Mazarek to administer his possessions in Zeta. Until then, Mazarek administered Lazarević's possessions in Rudnik (1414) and Ostrovica. Noblemen from Bar were then invited to a meeting in the cathedral of St. George where they recognized the suzerainty of the Serbian despot while Mazarek recognized their right to govern the city according to their own legislations.

Serbian despotate in 1422

==== Truce ====
Lazarević concluded the six-months truce with Venice and left to support king Sigismund in his fight against the Hussites. The truce was agreed to last until 15 May 1422.

The Venetians used the truce to reinforce the Shkodër garrison. They transported soldiers, food, and arms to Shkodër through river Buna.

During the truce in the first half of 1422, peace negotiations were held in Venice and attended by the despot's envoy Duke Vitko. They were continued in Serbia between Venice's envoy Marco Barbadigo and Lazarević himself. When Lazarević demanded the surrender of disputed towns, Venice refused and war resumed.

==== Battles on Buna ====
Despot Stefan did not continue the war immediately after the truce because he was busy with other activities, but his voivode Mazarek undertook actions to prevent Venetian reinforcement of the Shkodër garrison. He erected several fortresses on the right bank of river Buna from where he controlled the river. When Venetian captain Niccolo Capello was sent to transport food, supplies, and archers to the besieged Shkodër using three galleys, Mazarek's forces on Buna forced his galleys to retreat to the Adriatic Sea. In July 1422, the Venetian Senate ordered Niccolo Capello to return to Buna and complete his mission, but he decided to wait for two galleys of providur and supracomite Marco Bembo and Marco Barbo carrying soldiers and material for destruction of the fortress Mazarek had erected in Shirgj.

==== Siege of Scutari in 1422 ====
Lazarević's forces besieged Shkodër, probably in June 1422, and for a year, it seemed that Venice would have lost their possessions. In November 1422, a Venetian fleet destroyed Mazarek's fortresses on Buna and reached Shirgj. Due to low water level they could not continue their voyage through Buna.

Supported by some local Albanians, Venice managed to break the siege in December 1422. The Shkodër garrison led by captain Niccolo Capello unexpectedly attacked Lazarević's army during one December night and broke the siege. After the siege was broken Venetians reinforced Shkodër's garrison with additional 400 cavalry and between 200 and 300 infantry.

==== Siege of Scutari in 1423 ====
Lazarević's army did not suffer serious casualties and returned under Shkodër's fortress in January 1423. In January 1423, Venice bribed and won over the Pamaliots on Buna, and then bought over several tribal leader in or near Zeta: the Paštrovići, Gjon Kastrioti (who had extended to the outskirts of Alessio), the Dukagjins, and Koja Zaharija. Though none of these were mobilized militarily by Venice, they left the ranks of Lazarević's army, thus became a potential danger to Lazarević. Although Venetian admiral Francesco Bembo offered money to Gjon Kastrioti, Dukagjins, and to Koja Zaharija in April 1423 to join the Venetian forces against the Serbian Despotate, they refused.

In summer of 1423, Despot Lazarević sent Đurađ Branković with 8,000 cavalry to Zeta. He besieged Shkodër and erected fortresses on Bojana to cut off Venetian supplies of the besieged city. Duke Sandalj was prepared to support Lazarević in his attempts to capture Shkodër. Faced with such difficult situation Venetian governors were instructed to negotiate peace.

== End of war ==
=== Treaty of Sveti Srđ ===
The conflict was ended in August 1423, after conclusion of the treaty (the Peace of Sveti Srđ). In the name of the Serbian Despotate, the treaty was signed by Đurađ Branković (with two witnesses who were Ottoman officials). Branković was the despot's representative in Zeta since 1423 and was also in charge for all negotiations. According to the treaty the Serbian Despotate kept Drisht and Bar while Venice kept Shkodër, Ulcinj, and Kotor. Venice was obliged to return Budva and Grbalj region to Serbia and to pay 1,000 ducats in annual tribute for Shkodër to the Lazarević family, which they initially had paid out to Balša III. Both parties agreed to exchange prisoners and to raze their forts on Buna which was agreed to be completely in Venetian hands.

After the treaty was signed Francesco Bembo invited Đurađ Branković to a ceremonial reception organized on his ship sailing through Buna, followed by other ships of the Venetian fleet. Đurađ then asked Venice to support him with six galleys in an eventual war against the Ottomans and to confirm him all privileges previously held by his father Vuk, knez Lazar, and Despot Stefan Lazarević.

=== Treaty of Vučitrn ===
Although the treaty of Sveti Srđ had been signed there were many issues that remained unresolved. Therefore, the situation was not fully resolved until the final settlement was achieved by an agreement signed in Vučitrn in 1426. The treaty of Vučitrn was revised in Drivast on 11 November 1426.

== Aftermath ==
Đurađ Branković succeeded Stefan Lazarević after his death in 1427 and lost control over Bar to the Venetians in 1443.

== Sources ==
- Božić, Ivan (1979). Nemirno pomorje XV veka (in Serbian). Belgrade: Srpska književna zadruga. OCLC 5845972.
- Van Antwerp Fine, John (1987), The Late Medieval Balkans: A Critical Survey from the Late Twelfth Century, University of Michigan Press, ISBN 978-0-472-10079-8
