= Shirgj =

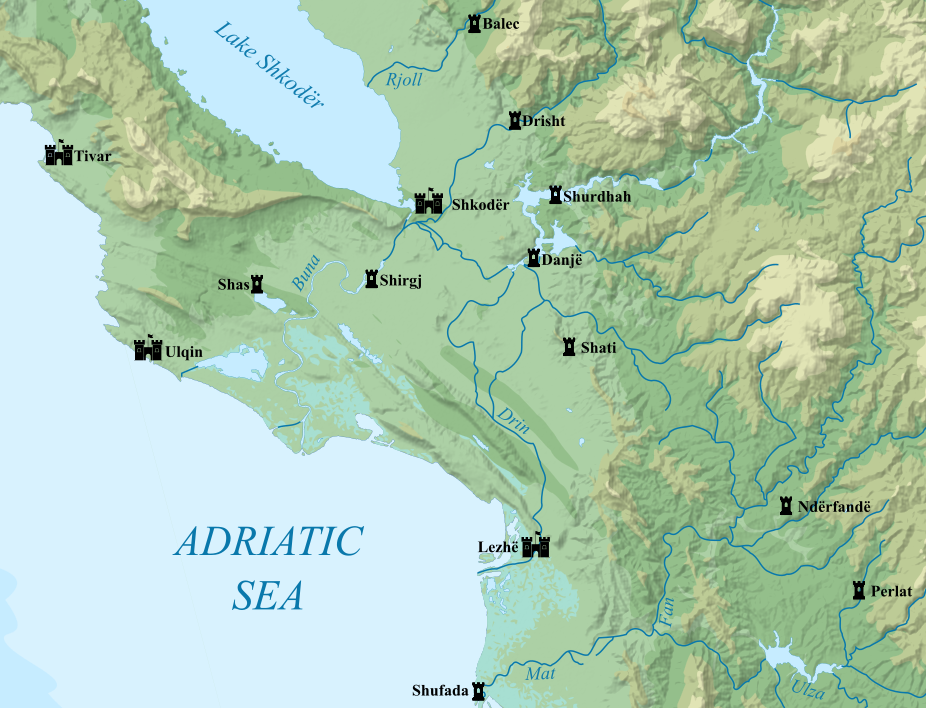
Shirgj and nearby towns

Shirgj (Latin: St. Sergius, Italian: San Sergio, Serbian: Свети Срђ, Sveti Srđ) was an important market town on the left bank of the river Buna, 6 miles (9.7 km) away from Shkodër, in what is today northern Albania. It was a medieval trading center, until it lost its population and ceased to exist in the early Ottoman period.

== Location ==
Shirgj emerged near the Benedictine Shirgj Monastery, an abbey dedicated to Sergius and Bacchus built in the 13th century by Saint Helen of Serbia. Due to its favorable geographical position near the mouth of the river Buna, it grew to surpass other towns of the region.

== History ==
Since the reign of Stefan Nemanja in the Serbian Grand Principality, Shirgj was one of four markets allowed to trade salt (the other three being Kotor and Drijeva while Dubrovnik joined them after it was established as a republic in the mid 14th century) in the Serbian maritime. Although a lot of wood was transported by Buna, Shirgj was not a trading place for wood, but instead for salt and leather. It was one of two customs areas of the region (the other one was Dagnum on the river Drin).

In 1330 near Shirgj, the King of Serbia Stefan Dečanski met with envoys of Dubrovnik who congratulated him on his victory in the Battle of Velbazhd. On that occasion, Dečanski asked them to support his military campaigns with six galleys. After the collapse of the Serbian Empire in 1371, Shirgj belonged to Zeta until 1392 when Ottomans captured Zeta's lord Đurađ II Balšić. They soon released him after they first captured Dagnum, Shkodër and Shirgj. In autumn 1395 Balšić recaptured his towns including Shirgj. Knowing he would not be able to keep those towns if Ottomans decided to capture them he ceded them to the Venetians. Soon, in 1397, Danj was granted the right to trade salt. Thus, the Venetian takeover ended the monopoly on salt trading that Shirgj had held in the Buna region for centuries.

A peace treaty signed in Shirgj in 1423 ended the Second Scutari War waged between the Serbian Despotate (initially Zeta) and the Venetian Republic over Shkodër and other former possessions of Zeta controlled by Venice. This treaty is known as the Peace of Shirgj. While it was in Venetian hands the salt traded in Shirgj had to be transported from, also Venetian controlled, Corfu.

After the Ottoman-Albanian wars ended and the last independent parts of Albania became part of Ottoman Empire, Shirgj, as some other important settlements in Albania, became unpopulated and ceased to exist.

== Sources ==
- Fine, John Van Antwerp (1994). The Late Medieval Balkans: A Critical Survey from the Late Twelfth Century to the Ottoman Conquest. University of Michigan Press. ISBN 978-0-472-08260-5.
