= Rudnik (Gornji Milanovac) =

Rudnik Рудник
- Town
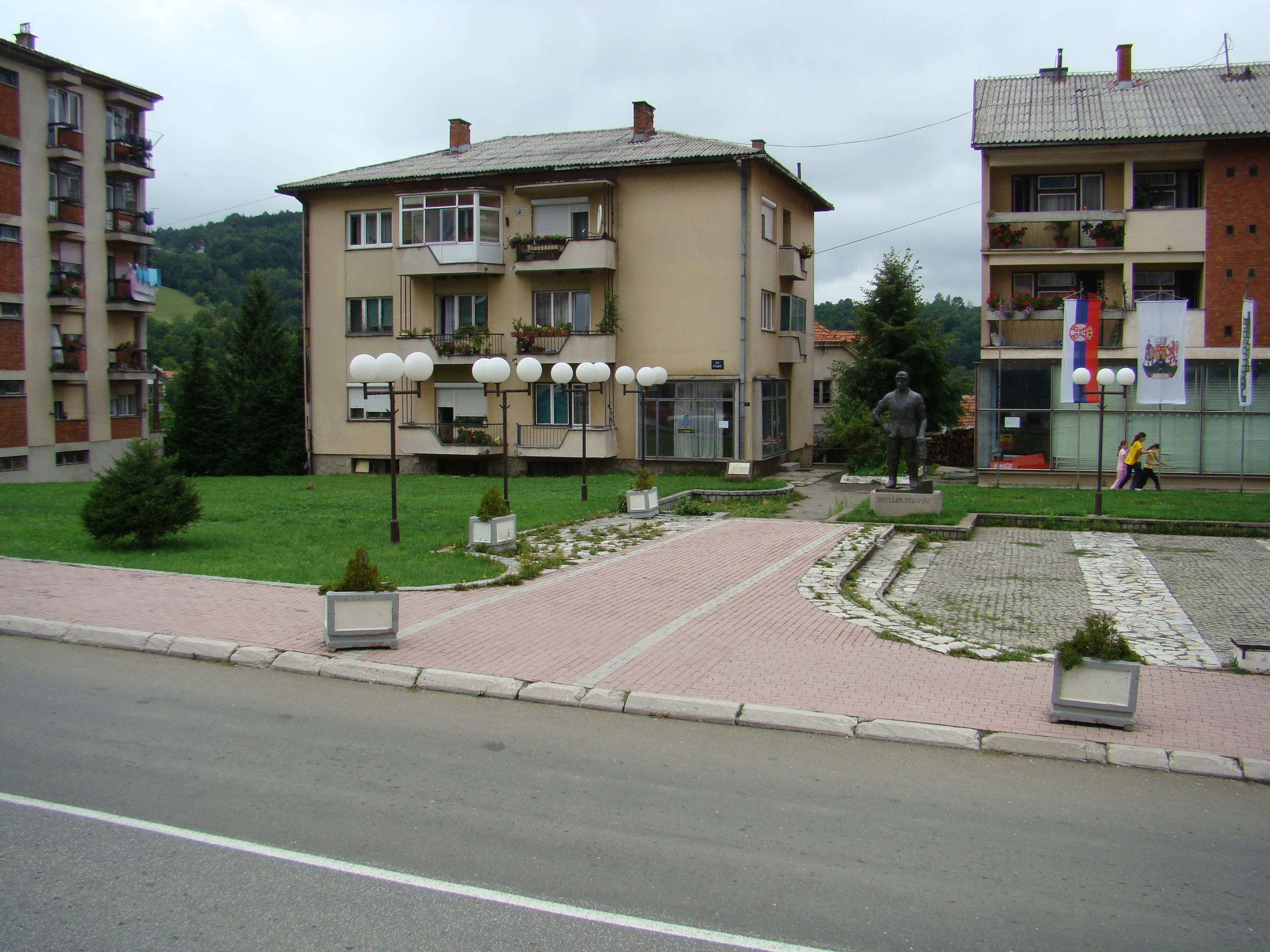

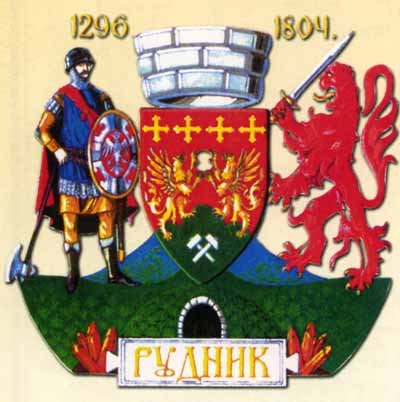
- Seal

- Location within Serbia
- Coordinates: 44°08′27″N 20°29′56″E
- Country: Serbia
- District: Moravica District
- Municipality: Gornji Milanovac

Area
  - Total: 23.38 km^{2} (9.03 sq mi)
- Elevation: 595 m (1,952 ft)

Population (2011)
  - Total: 1,490
  - Density: 63.7/km^{2} (165/sq mi)
- Time zone: UTC+1 (CET)
  - Summer (DST): UTC+2 (CEST)

Rudnik is a small town in the municipality of Gornji Milanovac, Serbia. According to the 2011 census, the town has a population of 1,490 people.

== History ==
In 1363 it was under the control of Nikola Altmanović. It probably fell under the control of his uncle Vojislav Vojinović some years earlier and had been granted to Nikola as a vassal.

Mineral resources in this area attracted the attention of the Old Romans, who conquered this region later since they needed the ore to forge coins and arms. After a long period of battles with the Celts and the remaining Illyrians, the area was integrated into the Roman provinces. Right next to the mine shafts on the south-western side of Mt. Rudnik, a stone plate was found with the inscription: TERRA MATER TEA – “The Mother Earth Goddess”. This temple served to the miners who prayed there for rescue in case of emergency before entering the shaft. The temple was destroyed at one point in time, to be reconstructed by the Emperor Septimius Severus, who placed the above- mentioned stone plate at its entrance. One millennium later first documents mentioning Rudnik can be found. Since 1300, Serbian silver coins were made at Rudnik under the rule of king Stefan Dragutin. It was a prosperous time for Rudnik. This importance of Rudnik last for more than 150 years, until 1458. Coins had 2.4 grs and they were more valuable than other coins made in Serbia. Apart from silver, lead and copper were also extracted.

The village was active in the Serbian Revolution, being organized into the knežina (administrative unit) of Kačer during the First Serbian Uprising (1804–13). Among revolutionaries from the village were Periša Rakić, a starešina (leader) in Kačer knežina; Todor Rakić and Marko Rakić, captains of Kačer; Nikola Rakić, Toma Terzija, Buća Bošković, hajduks; Ilija Čivović, Marko Stanković, Mina Nikolić, Maksim Čivović, soldiers; Radojica Žujović, archpriest (prota) of Rudnik; Mijat, buljubaša (captain) and knez.
