= Avret Pazarları =

Non-elite-commoner-women slavery in Ottoman times

Avret Pazarları (Note: In (Ottoman) Turkish, the term avret was typically used for common married or adult women, while hatun denoted more respected women. During Ottoman times, unmarried adolescent girls were referred to as kiz. They enjoyed greater mobility and autonomy until marriage, but upon marriage and being labeled avret, their mobility and sexuality became subject to significant social control to prevent adultery and preserve male lineage rights and patriarchal honor. Since the 20th century, in modern Turkish, the use of the term avret has been limited to intimate body parts.; *Pazarları is the plural form of Pazari, derived from the Persian word Bazaar, meaning market.) (Ottoman Turkish: عورة پازار, romanized: Avret Pazarları), or female slave bazaar, was a market of female slaves located in Istanbul, Ottoman Empire (modern-day Turkey), operating from the mid-15th century to the early 20th century. Many households owned female slaves, employing them as domestic servants. The Ottoman state regulated the slave market and imposed taxes on every slave transaction.

Women were captured from diverse African, Asian, and European regions and traded in Istanbul markets. In contrast to male slaves, women were often subject to sexual exploitation, with their sexuality considered the personal property of their owners. Female slaves were frequently valued based on physical attributes like beauty and entertaining skills, especially when chosen by elite men as slaves or concubines.

Slaves were sold to both commoners and the elite, including members of the Imperial Palace. Turkish media often overlooks non-elite or commoner women in slavery, instead focusing more on relatively privileged slaves in the Ottoman Imperial Harem. However, descriptions of Ottoman times do mention slaves owned by commoners in contemporary slave narratives, travelers' accounts, folk songs, late Ottoman Turkish novels, and 20th-century poems.

The Avret Pazarları slave market was officially closed during the Disestablishment of the Istanbul Slave Market in 1846–1847, though in practice the slave trade in Istanbul continued clandestinely until the early 20th century.

== History and context ==
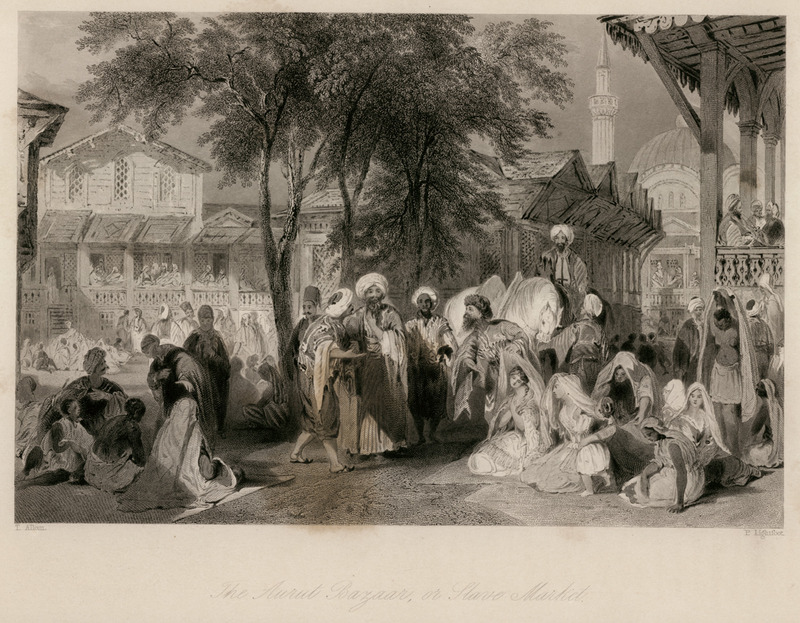
The Aurut Bazaar, also known as the Slave Market, depicted by Walsh Robert & Allom Thomas in 1836.

The general slave trade of men and women was referred to as Esir Pazari. A sizable majority of the slaves traded in the Ottoman slave trade were women; every substantial household and many less substantial households owned female slaves, including many as domestic servants. In history as well as in conventional scholarship on Ottoman historiography, non-elite slaves and women are underrepresented.

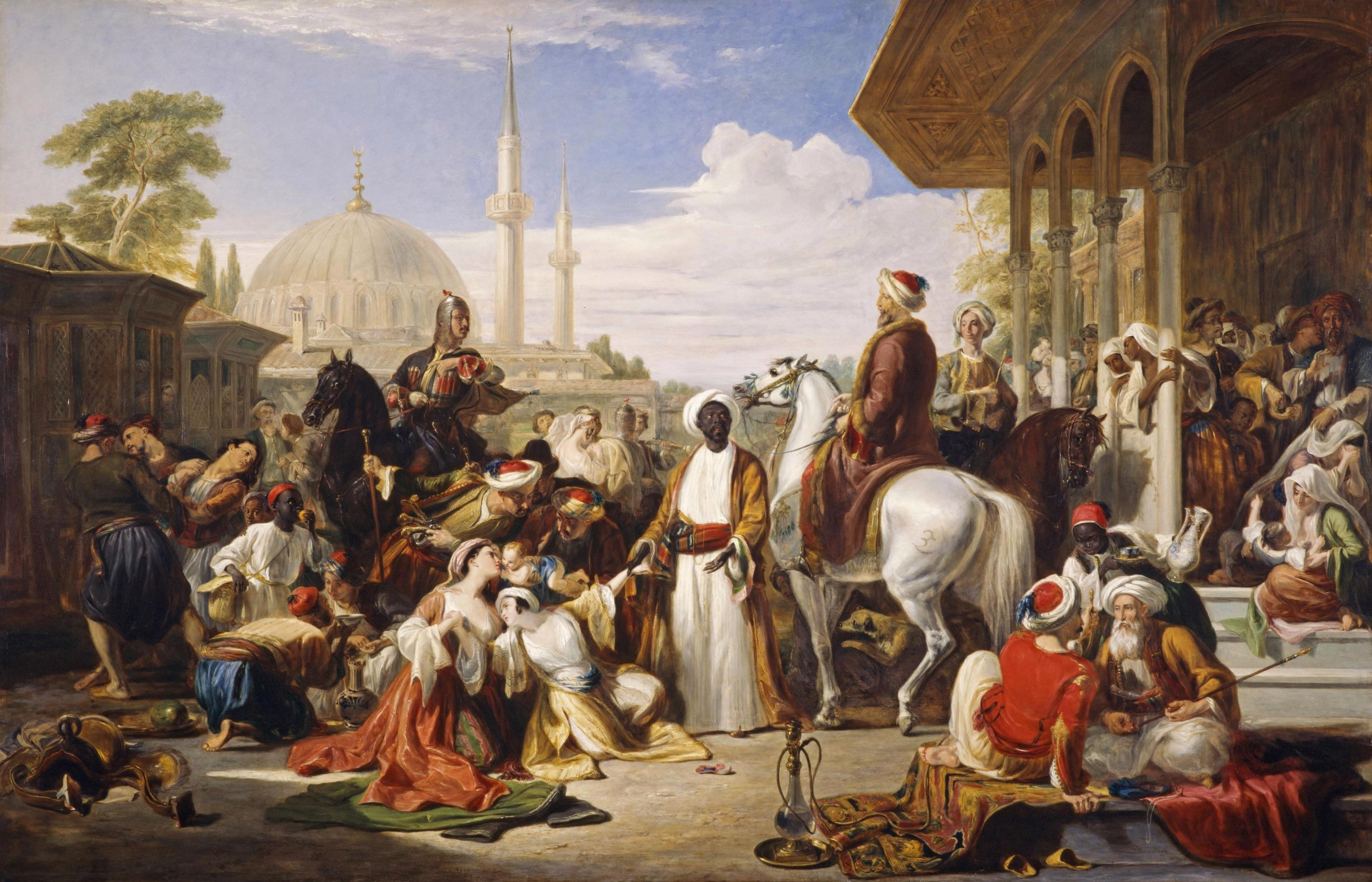
William Allan (1782–1850) - The Slave Market in Constantinople - NG 2400 - National Galleries of Scotland

The Ottoman Empire adopted practices akin to those of other slave societies, particularly preceding Islamic states such as the Caliphates of al-Mu'tasim and the Mamluk Sultanate. Across various Muslim societies, slavery was governed by a common legal framework rooted in Islamic law. Harem slavery, in particular, played a central role in the households of early modern Ottoman imperial and elite families.

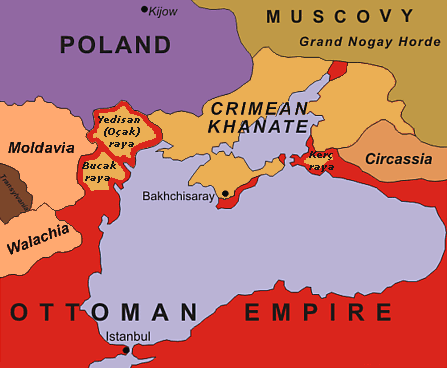
Slaves imported from the Crimean Khanate around 1600, depicted on a political map. It's noteworthy that the areas marked as Poland and especially Muscovy were claimed rather than administered and were thinly populated.

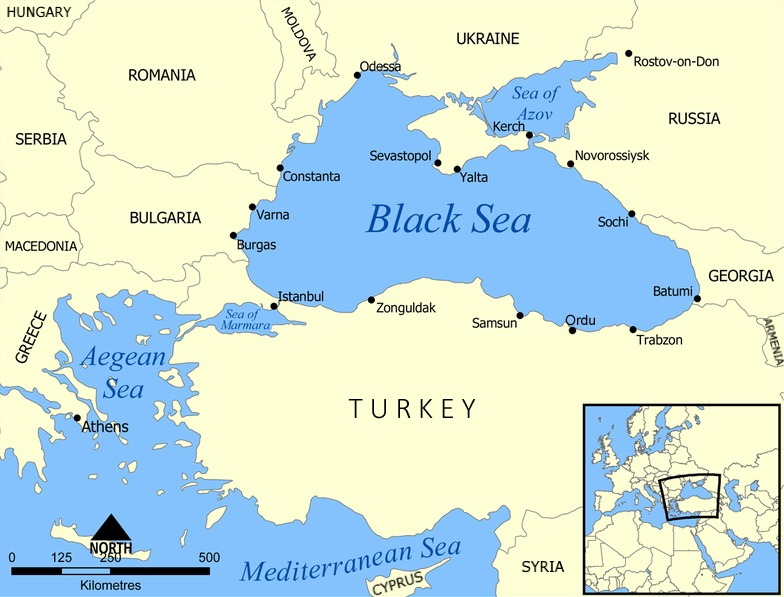
Contemporary Black Sea map

In 1453 AD, Constantinople (modern-day Istanbul) became the capital of the Ottoman Empire. Throughout the centuries, it evolved into a hub for captive slaves, particularly women. From the 15th to the 18th centuries, a significant number of female captives were transported to Constantinople from various warfronts, including regions such as Greece, the Balkans, the northeastern shores of the Mediterranean Sea, and parts of Southeast Europe lying north of the Black Sea, such as modern-day Georgia and Circassia. These captives were enslaved, many of them ending up in concubinage within the Imperial harem of Ottoman sultans. Unlike the Atlantic slave trade, which typically had a male-female ratio of 2:1 or 3:1, the Ottoman slave trade often exhibited a higher proportion of females to males, suggesting a prevailing preference for female slaves. The incentive for importing (often European) female slaves lay in concubinage and reproduction, although many were also brought in primarily to perform household tasks.

Avret Pazary had become fully established by the 16th century. It is estimated that the number of women captured and enslaved by the Ottoman Empire exceeded a thousand per year. The demand for enslaved women was met through the capture of women by Corsairs, Tartars, and various slave dealers.

Slaves typically did not appear in written records unless reported by their masters, usually for absconding. Therefore, while knowing the exact number and composition of slaves remains difficult, an analysis of 16th-century absconders from Ottoman records indicates that some were captured in Ottoman war campaigns in the Balkans, while many others were captured from Russia and Poland by the incursions of the Crimean Khanate into those regions. Among absconding slaves, 39 percent were Russians, 31 percent were Serbs-Croats, 11 percent were Bosnians, and the remaining 19 percent were from Hungary, Bulgaria, and Walachia.

Ottaviano Bon, an early 17th-century Italian ambassador, made observations about the "Avret Pizary" in Istanbul:

For such a purpose, there is an enclosed public market in Constantinople in which an open auction each Wednesday female slaves of every sort are bought and sold, and everybody freely goes there to buy them...

— Ottaviano Bon

Bon goes on to say that slave girls in Istanbul were bought and sold like animals – ascertaining their country of origin, plus examining their bodies all over thoroughly to confirm that their buyer did not feel swindled. Virgin and beautiful girls received higher prices, and traders could be held responsible if an enslaved woman did not turn out to be a virgin as they had promised.

While Turkish free women, i.e., Muslim women, could not be enslaved and Muslim Turkish women had some level of legal prerogative against sexual exploitation, the same protections were not extended to non-Muslim foreigners. Sexual exploitation of female slaves could not be punished legally.

By 1717, Lady Mary Wortley Montagu, wife of a British ambassador to Istanbul, reported in her later published letter that the women slave market of Istanbul was somewhat dwindling.

The slave market was supervised and taxed by the Ottoman state. Control of the slave market was the authority of an official called the "esirci emini." A standard fee, set at 1/40th of the value of the slave, was imposed as a tax. A guild of slave merchants existed (known as the "esirci esnafi"), headed by a sheikh (the "esirci seyhi"). He was elected by the members of the guild and appointed by the Sultan's decree. Apart from Muslims, Jews were also involved in the slave market, but it is not known whether they were organized in guilds. According to the memoir of Elviya Celebi, the slave traders' guild "esirci esnafi" had around 2000 members, and their shops had slave rooms.

== Limitations of enslaved women ==
Although women slaves were mainly taken from war zones, referring to them as captives or prisoners of war was blatantly incorrect. It is significant to note that the women's religion was not the same as that of their captors, and most of them were not active combatants but were taken while going about their normal business as civilians, despite any sign of hostility. The women were captured from various African, Asian, and European territories and sold in Istanbul markets. Like male slaves, female slaves were considered the personal property of their owners. Although using female slaves for prostitution was technically illegal, selling a slave woman to another man for sex was permissible, and slave women had no legal protection over their sexuality. While slaves could seek recourse from Islamic courts for any other physical injury, the sexuality of women slaves was not their own to lose. As a result, they were unable to appeal to the courts or to the Sultans. Under systemic biases introduced under the Ottoman judicial system, enslaved women, most of whom were non-Muslims, were barred from testifying as witnesses against Muslims. The loss of a slave's virginity was not a matter for herself but rather for her owner, unlike physical injuries to a woman slave by a non-owner, for example, to the arm, leg, eye, or other part of the body. For instance, in the winter of 1817 AD, a female slave owner received compensation through the courts from a man who had raped her slave because the woman's virginity had been compromised, and it would no longer be possible for her owner to sell her as a highly priced virgin.

The literature on slavery-related Fatwa, covering Ottoman legal commentaries, is full of discussions about past, present, and future access to female slaves' sexuality. Queries were asked and answered about disputed paternity, prostitution, adultery, joint ownership of slaves, childbirth, marriage, violation of woman slaves by those other than the owner, and sexual relations with a wife's slave woman without the wife's consent. Muftis used to hold special authority as religious opinion givers, given that the interface between a slave's condition and the domestic household was problematic.

While some intellectuals debate whether individuals labeled as slaves would fit the Western understanding of slavery, scholars assert that there were instances where enslaved women faced abuse and lacked legal protections and rights. Some historians challenge the notion of contrasting law and society, yet law is inherently influenced by society, and Islamic law and culture contain provisions for enslaved individuals, aiding their integration into society over time. However, despite variations in application and practice, those in positions of power often impose legal systems to secure significant advantages for themselves. From the perspective of marginalized slaves, it's plausible to view the imposition of a legal system from outside as encroaching upon the micro-society of the enslaved.

Regarding the Ottoman legal system's treatment of slavery, individual rights to choice and consent were significantly restricted. Abuse and constraints were common, and female slaves were often regarded as mere possessions, listed in inheritance records alongside household items or livestock, or described in physical terms in court. Nineteenth-century European women visitors observed that slave women in harems enjoyed considerable leisure time and freedom of speech and action. They perceived the lives of these slaves as more desirable than those of domestic servants in the West.

Female slaves had limited opportunities, often based on physical attractiveness and talents for pleasing and entertaining male counterparts with flattering words and gestures. Elite men would select some as slaves or concubines, with a few chosen for the Imperial harem, others gifted to elite men, and the most attractive reserved for royal males or the Sultan himself. Slaves who bore a male child for the Sultan received extra privileges, but if they did not convert to Islam, they would be separated from their child, who would be raised as a Muslim. Only a rare few concubines had the chance to become an official wife of the Sultan, and even fewer became beloved wives. Among them, those whose child was selected as Sultan would receive the highest honor as the "Walide" (Mother) of the Sultan.

According to Lidia Zhigunova, women in the Caucasus faced multiple colonizing influences during the Ottoman era. Western and Russian narratives often fixated on stereotypes of beauty and sexuality, particularly focusing on elite "Circassian beauties" involved in the Circassian slave trade, while overlooking their agency, voices, resistance, and diversity. Zhigunova and Tlostanova argue that unlike Western slavery, Ottoman slavery did not completely strip slaves of their rights and humanity. Slaves were better absorbed and integrated into society, with opportunities for status change, particularly for women through marriage possibilities.

For instance, if an enslaved woman bore a child by her owner, she could not be easily resold, and her children were considered free. If the owner acknowledged them as his children, they had inheritance rights similar to those of children from a legitimate marriage. Consequently, several generations of slaves were gradually integrated into society. Additionally, female slaves could gain freedom upon their owner's death through a declaration known as "tedbir," wherein the owner promised manumission prior to death to earn religious merit.

However, Zhigunova also highlights instances of women being subjected to abuse. For example, on June 30, 1854, a Circassian slave woman named Shemsigul, from a poor background, testified to Cairo police about her ordeal. She was trafficked from her village in Circassia to Istanbul, where she was sexually assaulted by a slave trader named Deli Mehmet. Despite becoming pregnant from him, she was sold multiple times, even while pregnant, and faced attempts to induce abortion.

Toledano's research indicates that the trafficking of Circassian women was prevalent by the nineteenth century, especially after the mass expulsion of Circassians by the Russians from the 1850s onwards. Seeking refuge with the Ottomans often meant becoming slaves. When demand for white slave women decreased, black slave women were abandoned, leading to further destitution.

Suraiya Faroqhi contrasts the agency of Ottoman slaves with that of contemporary slaves in the Mughal Empire of South Asia. In the Ottoman Empire, slave women had better prospects for agency if they encountered elite masters. On the other hand, in the Mughal Empire, elites often included conditions in marriage contracts to ensure that legally wedded wives could dispose of their husbands' slave women and concubines as they pleased, thereby eliminating potential competition. While Ottoman women didn't resort to this tactic as frequently, they still faced familial jealousies and the risk of being discarded by their husbands if a slave woman or concubine gained greater favor.

In Ottoman society, any agency achieved by a slave woman often came at the expense of other women's agency. Whether governed by law or Sharia, the capacity for slaves to show initiative and gain agency remained limited. For instance, the mechanism of "tedbir" could be risky for achieving meaningful liberation upon the owner's death, as the owner couldn't dispose of two-thirds of their property, which would be inherited by others. Inheritors could argue that the value of the slave was too high for the owner to dispose of completely, allowing them to retain ownership rights over the slave.

Instead of framing Ottoman slaves within a binary classification of being slaves or not, some scholars place them along a broader spectrum. For instance, elite male slaves who advanced in military or administrative careers, enjoying a life filled with freedoms, wealth, and power, may not fit the Western notion of slavery. Conversely, elite harem women slaves might have shared wealth and power in some cases, but still experienced significant limitations on their freedoms. In contrast, non-elite, or menial slaves, faced the most severe legal disabilities and reduced life chances associated with traditional slavery.

Farhat Yasa's study of fatwas from the 16th to 18th centuries suggests that under certain circumstances, slave owners could kill their slaves without fear of punishment in the afterlife, highlighting the limited agency available to most female slaves. While some female slaves may have exhibited agency within narrow limits, others served merely as facades, with their owners using them to deflect punishment for their own crimes. Therefore, discussing agency among helpless female victims of slavery within the same spectrum may not be relevant.

According to Kate Fleet, female slaves in the Ottoman Empire had a greater chance of accessing public spaces compared to non-slave Muslim women. Elite women often had to be accompanied by their female slaves in public if no male relative was present. Female slaves sometimes gained a degree of agency as informants or spies.

However, access to public spaces for female slaves was often undignified. The visibility of a female slave was fluid, as she could transition quickly from being a protected possession to an exposed commodity. Female slaves had no control over the levels of visibility to which they were subjected; they could be openly handled naked by customers in slave markets or transformed from household servants to prostitutes at the whim of their owners.

== Geographies, locations and economics ==
The East European Crimean Khanate played a significant role in conducting raids, capturing, and exporting East European slaves through the Crimean slave trade, meeting the demands of the Ottoman Empire and beyond. The slave trade, enslavement, and ransoming became important sources of tax revenue for both the Crimean Khanate and the Ottoman Empire. While Islamic tradition often led to the religious manumission of many slaves, it also fueled continued demand for new slaves.

Similarly, Jewish slave traders had their own religious restrictions; once a slave owner had sexual relations with a female slave, he was required to either sell the slave or manumit them, thereby contributing to the demand for new slaves. This Ottoman practice sometimes led to population increases, resulting in economic pressure and occasional revolts that were subsequently suppressed. Many manumitted slaves ended up begging or returning to slavery due to the lack of alternative options.

In the Ottoman Empire, the primary races of females sold as sex slaves (known as Cariye) were the Circassians, Syrians, and Nubians. Circassian girls, described as fair-skinned, were frequently enslaved by Crimean Tatars and then sold to the Ottoman Empire to serve in harems. They were the most expensive, fetching prices of up to 500 pounds sterling, and were highly sought after by Turks. Syrian girls, with dark eyes, dark hair, and light brown skin, were the second most popular. They mainly hailed from coastal regions in Anatolia and could fetch prices of up to 30 pounds sterling. Nubian girls were the least expensive and least popular, selling for up to 20 pounds sterling. Sex roles and symbolism in Ottoman society served as expressions of power, with the palace harem segregating enslaved women from the rest of society.

The Ottoman slave trade with South Asia operated bidirectionally, albeit to a lesser extent compared to the Uzbek slave trade in the region. While it addressed the demand for white female slaves in elite South Asian harems, South Asian markets predominantly supplied non-Muslim female slaves.

=== Avret Pazari of Istanbul at Forum of Arcadius ===
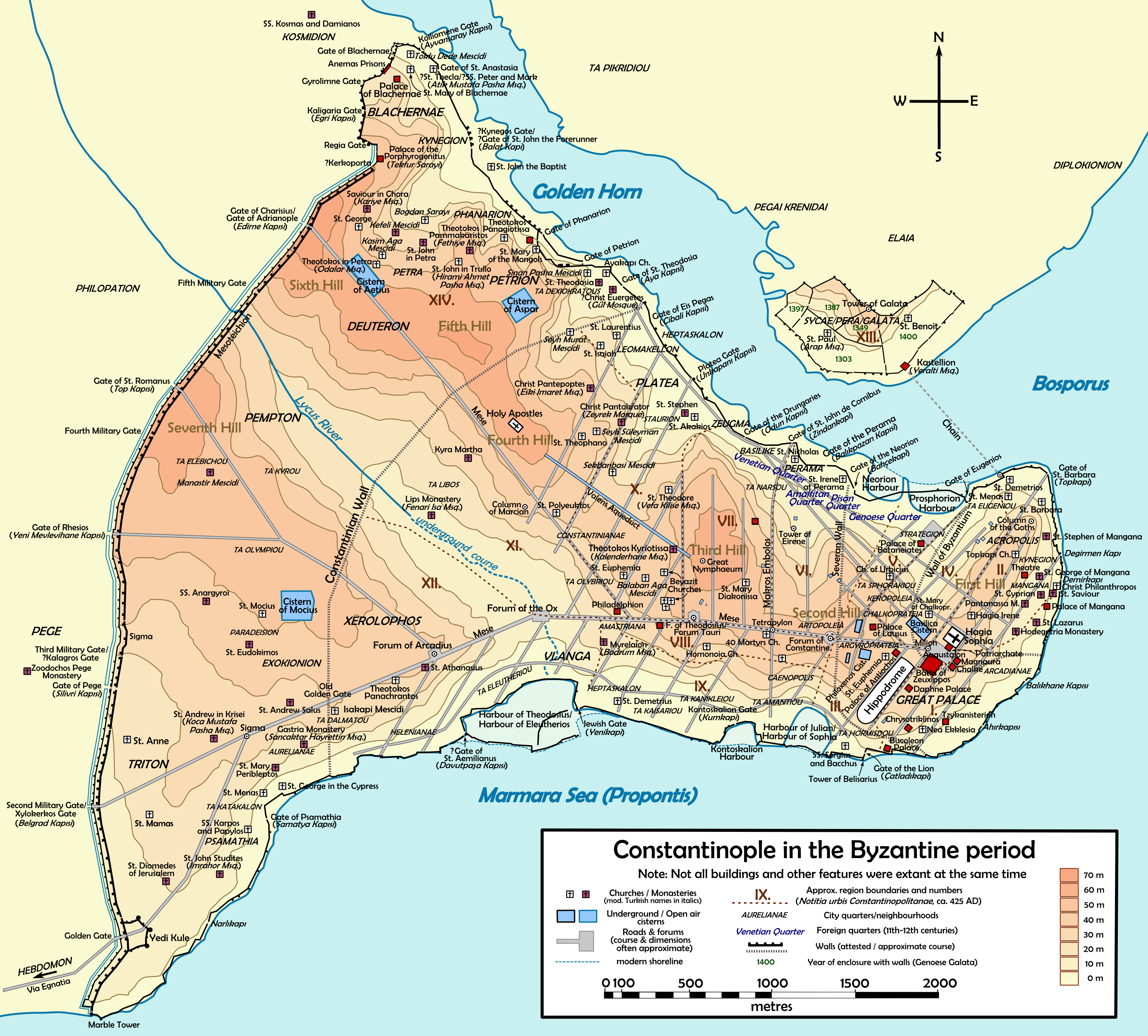
Map of Byzantine Constantinople (Pre-Ottoman). It shows the location of the Forum of Arcadius near the Ese Kapi Mosque, situated at the corner between the Walls of Constantine and the southern branch of the Mese, in the southwestern part of the city near the seventh hill.

The Avret Pazari of Istanbul was situated near the Forum of Arcadius. Adjacent to the Avret Bazaar lies a small mosque to the west, known as the Ese Kapi Mosque, with the adjoining street named Isa Kapoussi Sokaki. The journey described by Hobhouse occurred in 1809–10, and the "last rebellion" likely refers to the Ottoman coups of 1807–08, specifically Kabakçı Mustafa's rebellion of 1807. It appears that the "Aurat-Bazar" mentioned by Hobhouse, which was reportedly burned down before 1810, was reconstructed on the same site. This bazaar is described as standing "near the burnt column". The reference to the Column of Arcadius is evident from an earlier work by Walsh. Moreover, this same text explicitly identifies the "Aurut Bazaar" as "[t]he usual place where Circassian slaves are sold". In her 1837 visit, English novelist Julia Pardoe described the Istanbul slave market as a square court surrounded by low stone rooms or cells on three sides, with a projecting wooden peristyle beyond.

=== Other locations ===
There is a street in Gaziantep named Avrat Pazarı. It runs parallel to İnönü Street, just north of the Old Municipality and Şıra Inn. The street starts across from the west-facing door of Kemikli Bedestens and opens onto Şıhcan Street. Other Ottoman cities, such as Belgrade, Sofia, Damascus, and Aleppo, also had slave markets.

== Captures, retrievals, escapes and flights ==
=== George of Hungary ===
George of Hungary (c. 1422–1502) was an Ottoman slave captured and sold into slavery when the Ottoman Turks invaded the town of Mühlbach (now Sebeș) in 1438. George managed to escape and converted back to Christianity, later documenting his experiences.

"..There they are examined and stripped...the private parts of men and women are handled and openly shown before everyone. Naked, they are compelled to go before everyone, to run, walk, and jump, so that it may be plainly apparent whether they are sick or healthy, male or female, old or young, virgin or corrupt"... "There the son is sold while the grieving mother looks on. There the mother is brought to the confusion and humiliation of the son. There the wife is mocked as a harlot and is handed over to another man, while her husband blushes. There is a little one snatched from the bosom of his mother while she is sold off, with every deep emotion shaken."

=== Emily Ruete ===
There is a lack of non-elite slave narratives or folk literature from Circassian women. Emily Ruete's account of the kidnapping and enslavement of her mother, Jilfidan, is one of the few available testimonies about a captive female slave. Before being sold to Ruete's father, Jilfidan was a common non-elite slave, but upon being purchased by Ruete's father, she became an elite slave, specifically a concubine. Ruete documented her mother Jilfidan's captivity in her writings.

...My mother was a Circassian by birth, who in early youth had been torn away from her home. Her father had been a farmer, and she had always lived peacefully with her parents and her little brother and sister. War broke out suddenly, and the country was overrun by marauding bands; on their approach, the family fled into an underground place, as my mother called it — she probably meant a cellar, which is not known in Zanzibar. Their place of refuge was, however, invaded by a merciless horde, the parents were slain, and the children were carried off by three mounted Arnauts. One of these, with her elder brother, soon disappeared out of sight; the other two, with my mother and her little sister, three years old, crying bitterly for her mother, kept together until evening, when they too parted, and my mother never heard any more of the lost ones as long as she lived.

She came into my father's possession when quite a child, probably at the tender age of seven or eight years, as she cast her first tooth in our house...

=== Margaret Himfi ===
The Hungarian noblewoman Margaret Himfi was abducted and enslaved by Ottoman marauders at the turn of the 14th and 15th centuries. She later became a slave mistress of a wealthy Venetian citizen of Crete, with whom she had two daughters. Margaret was able to return to Hungary in 1405.

During one of the first Ottoman incursions at the borderland of the Kingdom of Hungary, Margaret was abducted from her family seat, the village of Egerszeg in Temes County (now part of Vermeș in Romania). By 1405, Margaret was found and had two underage children. Before 1405, she was sold in Crete, an overseas colony of the Republic of Venice known as the Kingdom of Candia. Margaret became a slave mistress of a wealthy citizen named Giorgio Darvasio, from a Venetian merchant family. She had two daughters with him, Marieta and Iacoba, who were still minors in 1405 and even in 1408. Despite being well-treated by Darvasio during her captivity, Margaret never gave up on her intention to return to Hungary.

On July 1, 1405, a charter was issued on Crete regarding Margaret. Darvasio agreed to release her without any ransom and provided an escort for her return to Hungary. Initially, he wanted one of their daughters to remain in Crete, but eventually agreed to occasional visits to Hungary to see Margaret and the children. In the charter, Marcali expressed his intention to return to Crete for Margaret and the children. Darvasio transferred Margaret and their daughters to Venice to facilitate their travel to Hungary. There, he handed them over to Margaret's alleged brother-in-law, John of Redel, and covered her travel expenses. Margaret was finally able to return to Hungary after many years and settled in Buda with her children.

=== Other examples ===
In the 1460s, Ilona from Garai, the wife of Tamas, was taken captive. She managed to escape at an opportune moment, but was recaptured and eventually resold by Serbs five times before successfully escaping again. Similarly, in 1471, Anna Nagy also escaped from captivity, although these instances were exceptions. Several women who were taken captive could not be found again, despite efforts by their families or the state to arrange for ransom. In most cases, the women were unable to afford ransom.

== Travelers' descriptions ==
In 1592, Venetian ambassador Lorenzo Bernardo wrote that to the Ottoman Empire, the Adyghas and Mingrelians:

"... represent something like a slave mine ..., whom they take to Constantinople like cattle and sell them in auctions..."

17th-century Ottoman traveler Evliya Çelebi, who participated in some raids and took captives, wrote about his travels in the Crimean Khanate, one of the largest slave suppliers to the Ottomans. He described the Karasubazar slave market as follows:

"... A man who had not seen this market, had not seen anything in this world. A mother is severed from her son and daughter there, a son – from his father and brother, and they are sold amongst lamentations, cries of help, weeping and sorrow."

Robert Walsh, a writer of Irish descent who, in his later career, campaigned against slavery, was the chaplain to the British Embassy in Constantinople from roughly 1820 to 1827. During this time, he witnessed and described the condition of the newly enslaved residents of Sciote (Chios) following the 1822 Chios massacre, which was carried out by Ottomans from the nearby Greek majority island. In 1829, he wrote:

"The first news of these events was brought to Constantinople by the caiquegees, hummals, and other adventurers of the rabble, who returned with boats full of plunder and slaves. The Oriental manner of making slaves, and securing a property in them, is this. Any fellows who join an expedition as volunteers for plunder of this kind enter a house, and after setting fire to it, and killing generally the adult males, they carry off the property, with the females and boys. They then proceed to the next custom-house, and having paid twenty piasters, or about ten shillings, they take out a teskerai, or a ticket, which certifies the slavery, and then the persons of the unfortunate family become the property of the captors forever, with all their posterity! If any of them is disposed to sell the whole or part, he gives up with them their teskerai, which transfers the property to the purchaser in perpetuity. Forty-one thousand teskerais were granted in this way for Sciote slaves up to the 1st of May, of which five thousand had been taken out for those proceeding to Constantinople alone, and generally by fellows in the lowest grade of society.

The usual place where Circassian slaves are sold is the Aurut Bazaar, or Women's Market, in the vicinity of the Burnt Column. Here decorum is no further violated than in the act of sale. It consists of a quadrangular building, with an open court in the middle. Round this are raised platforms, on which black slaves sit: behind is latticed windows lighting apartments, where the white and more costly women are shut up till they are sold, and there is a certain decency and propriety observed in the purchase. But the glut of unfortunate Sciotes was such, that they were exhibited for sale in any public place, even the streets. The most usual was the Baluk Bazaar, or Fish Market. Here, the first exposure was a number of poor girls, of the age of twelve or fourteen, who were sold like cattle at an English fair. Several of them were without trousers, or the necessary articles of dress. Terror and anxiety had so affected them, that they exhibited the most deplorable picture of human suffering I ever beheld, and such as cannot be described; yet they were treated by the Turks with contemptuous freedom as if they did not think they ought to show them the courtesies of decorum which a sense of modesty generally induces a Turk to show to any other female. They were taken and handled with the roughness of butchers examining young cattle, and generally sold at the rate of one hundred piastres, or 3/. a head. Five hundred were disposed of here in this way, and Turkish men and women were everywhere seen leading young Christian slaves to their houses.

The next day, June the 16th, was Sunday, and a slave-market was established in Pera Street, leading to our palace. A number of captives had been brought up the day before, and some of them exposed for sale in that place,..." (caiquegees = Caïque-men, hummals = porters )

In 1828, Charles Macfarlane provided a description of Constantinople.

"...this woman had come over to Chesmé, and bargained with the Turk for her liberation. He asked the sum of twelve hundred piastres; they could scarcely raise twelve; – but they applied to the Franks who had come to Chesmé, and through their subscriptions, added to those of the captain and officers of the English brig-of-war, the "Jasper," and what I gave, they collected eight hundred piastres, which, at the intercession of my friend, Mr. W–, the Turk agreed to take. The poor Sciote had just received the liberating paper, signed and sealed by the Moollah and her old master, and had come to thank me for the part I had taken in restoring her to the blessings of freedom."

Admiral Sir Adolphus Slade CB (1804 – 13 November 1877) was a British admiral who served as an admiral in the Ottoman Navy.

"Occasionally, I will not deny, heart rending scenes occur, in the case of captives of war, or victims of revolt, wrenched suddenly from all that is dear; but these are rare occurrences. The Circassians and Georgians, who form the trade supply, are only victims of custom, willing victims; being brought up by their mercenary parents for the merchants. ... they look for the moment of going to Anapa, or Poti, whence they are shipped for Stamboul, ... In the market they are lodged in separate apartments, carefully secluded, where, in the hour of business – between nine and twelve – they may be visited by aspirants for possessing such delicate ware. I need not draw a veil over what follows. Decorum prevails. The would-be purchaser may fix his eyes on the lady's face, and his hands may receive evidence of her bust. The waltz allows nearly as much liberty before hundreds of eyes. Of course merchant gives his warranty, on which, and the preceding data, the bargain is closed. The common price for a tolerable-looking girl is 100/. Some fetch hundreds ... such are generally singled out by Kislar Aga. A coarser article, from Nubia and Abyssinia, is exposed publicly on platforms, beneath verandahs, before the cribs of white china. A more white toothed, plump cheeked, ... with a smile and gibe for every one, and often an audible "Buy me." They are sold easily, and without trouble. Ladies are the usual purchasers, for domestics. A slight inspection suffices The girl gets up off the ground, gathers her coarse cloth round her loins, bids her companions adieu, and trips gaily, bare footed and bare headed, after her new mistress, who immediately dresses her à la Turque, and hides her ebony with white veils. The price of one is about 16/. Males are sold in a different place – always young. Boys fetch a much higher price than girls, for evident reasons: in the East, unhappily, they are also subservient to pleasure, and when grown up are farther useful in many ways; if clever, may arrive at higher employments; whereas woman is only a toy with Orientals, and, like a toy, when discarded, useless."

Danish author Hans Christian Andersen visited Istanbul in April 1841 and penned:

"...Not far from great bazaar, we come to place surrounded by wooden buildings, forming an open gallery; the jutting roof is supported by rough beams; inside along the gallery, are small chambers where trader stow their goods, and these goods are human beings, black and white female slaves. (Note: While Hans Christian Andersen description matches for Istanbul but Turkish translator of Hans Christian Andersen book uses the term "Kızlarağası Hanı" (which means something like "Girls' Master Lodge"), but a place known as "Kızlarağası Hanı" is in İzmir)

We are now in the square, the sun shines, rush mats are spread over under the green trees, and there sit and lie Asia's daughters. A young mother gives the breast to her child, and they will separate these two. On the stairs leading to the gallery sits a young negress not more than fourteen years of age; she is almost naked; an old Turk regards her. He has taken one of her legs in hand; she laughs and shows her shining white teeth.

Do not veil the beautiful white women, thou hideous old wretch; it is these we wish to see; drive them not into the cage; we shall not, as thou thinkest, abash them with bold eyes.

See! a young Turk with fiery looks; four slaves follow him; two old Jewesses are trading with him. Some charming Tscherkasier girls have come; he will see them dance, hear them sing, and then choose and buy! He could give us a description of the slave market, such as we are not able to offer..."

— A Poet's Bazaar. Hans Christian Andersen · 1871

== Cultural depictions ==
=== Reflection in folk songs ===
Many Russian, Ukrainian, and Polish folk songs from the Ottoman Empire era reflect the impact of raids on common people in Eastern Europe and the Black Sea regions.

The fires are burning behind the river—
The Tatars are dividing their captives
Our village is burnt and our property plundered.
Old mother is sabred
And my dear is taken into captivity.

~ A Ukrainian folk song

In Claude Fauriel's collection of Greek folk songs, published in 1824–25, several songs mention Greek slaves of the Turks or the peril of falling into slavery and fighting to resist it. These songs depict events predating the revolution (before 1821), particularly the conflicts between the Souliotes and Ali Pasha of Jannina and Albanian Muslims. Despo, the wife of Souliote chieftain Tzavellas, is celebrated in these songs for her act of honor suicide along with other women, rather than facing capture and enslavement. In one poignant scene, when women and children find themselves besieged in a small fortress with no hope of escape, Despo ignites the gunpowder keg. The original Greek text with a French translation can be found in Fauriel's work.

... 'O come, my children, come with me,
We shall not live as slaves of Turks.'
She touched the powder with the torch
— Engulfing flames consumed them all.

=== Literature ===
The return from captivity in the Ottoman Empire, depicted by Leopold Loeffler.

Literary depiction of female slavery issues as such begins in 19th-century Ottoman Turkish novels. According to Elif Aksit, while Samipaşazade Sezai, Ahmet Mithat, and Halit Ziya elaborate on the tragic lives of passive slave girls, Fatma Aliye focuses on empowerment even from slavery. The approaches of the first three authors indicate a choice to depict tragic and caricatured situations to create a strong emotional appeal to the prevailing change in public opinion. An 1877 novel 'Aşk-ı Vatan' (Love of Country), discussing the homesickness of a female slave and written by Zafer Hanım, is supposed to be the first novel by a Turkish female writer.

In Namık Kemal's first novel, İntibah (Awakening) (1876), a woman named Fatma purchases a slave girl named Dilaşub to divert her son Ali's attention from another woman, Mahpeyker. However, when Dilaşub fulfills her duty of distraction, Fatma, the owner, resells her at the slightest suspicion of her showing interest in another man. Aksit notes that Dilaşub is portrayed as inherently good but weak and submissive, bearing the consequences of others' weaknesses. Fatma manipulates both her son's and the slave girl's lives by buying and selling them according to her convenience. Aksit argues that early Ottoman male novelists often sympathized with slave girls, depicting their lives from childhood to womanhood, as seen in Ahmet Mithat's portrayal of his protagonist, Rakım, who educates his slave girl, Canan, and eventually marries her. Similarly, author Halid Ziya Uşaklıgil, in his novel Sefile (The Miserable) (1886–1887), describes an adventurous slave girl named Mazlume (feminine for 'Oppressed') who is sold and resold to both good and bad people, but fails to escape her fate as a slave girl.

In Samipaşazade Sezai's 1888 novel Sergüzeşt ("Life Story" or "Adventure"), the slave girl named Dilber is bought and resold from one family to another. Over time, Dilber transforms from a weak young girl into an attractive young woman. Aksit notes that, ironically, while Dilber's initial vulnerability protects her from both wanted and unwanted advances, her beauty and transition to womanhood become a fatal combination with her enslavement. In one owner's house, where she arrives as an attractive young woman, a young man initially ignores and mocks her, but eventually begins painting her picture, treating her like a mere object. Dilber revolts and cries, prompting him to recognize her humanity. They later fall in love. However, the lady of the house, his mother, sells Dilber in the market to prevent the love between a slave and a nobleman, leading Dilber to contemplate suicide due to her unrequited love.

While the novelist Fatma Aliye (1862 – 1936) was considered progressive for her time, viewing sexual slavery (along with polytheism) as forms of exploitation, Zeynep Direk argues that Aliye's response is insufficient from a feminist perspective. This is because Aliye focuses on defending Ottomanism and Islamism, downplaying the coercion, servitude, oppression, and sexual exploitation aspects of female slavery. She portrays female slavery in idyllic and romantic terms and does not advocate for the abolition of the institution of slavery, despite its legal abolition before Fatma Aliye's birth in 1847, though it was still practiced. However, the boundaries of female slavery in Aliye's novels are fluid. For example, in the novel Muhadarat, a non-slave woman, married to a wealthy man, sells herself into slavery to escape her husband. In another novel, the Enin family wants their son to marry their female slave, but the son, in love with someone else, refuses to marry the female slave. In yet another novel, Dar'ul Muallimat, the character Refet, the daughter of a poor female slave, attends school (Dar'ul Muallimat) to become a teacher.

According to Seteney Nil Dogan, the second generation of nationalist Circassian diaspora in the 1970s explored and criticized Circassians and Turks for human trafficking, arranged marriages, and involuntary unions through their periodicals and activism. In 1975, in the Circassian magazine Yamçı, a Circassian female author named Karden D. expressed her hope for the emancipation of Circassian women from being viewed as commodities, sold at the highest price. Following this, Kanuko Cemil authored a poem in the same magazine in 1976, illustrating the prevalent themes of forced marriages and human trafficking in the periodicals published by Circassian diaspora nationalists during the 1970s.

" ...Far away... In the East
Circassian girl is in the arm of the foreigner
........
........
In the spring of her life
Circassian girl is 19 years old
When she is sold viciously
The foreigner takes the girl, he is sixty years old
.....
It is sad but its reflection is true
[...] The master is on the mirror of shame.

~ Kanuko Cemil' 1976 poem in Circassian magazine Yamçı

Dogan and Toledano note that the discourse among descendants of slavery post-2000 emphasizes assimilation into Turkish identity while allowing for cultural diversity.

=== Television ===
Turkish television dramas typically overlook slavery among non-elite commoner women and instead concentrate on privileged female slavery within the elite Ottoman imperial palaces. Series like Muhteşem Yüzyıl (Magnificent Century) are exported to various Muslim countries, predominantly highlighting the elite aspect of Ottoman slavery. As a result, the new generation audience remains unaware of pre-20th-century Islamic sexual slavery forms. Despite approval from Islamic clergy, conservative audiences advocate for sanitized versions that omit any depiction of slave women in Ottoman times and life.

== See also ==
- That Most Precious Merchandise: The Mediterranean Trade in Black Sea Slaves, 1260-1500

== Works cited ==
- Allom, Thomas; Walsh, Robert (1839). Constantinople and the Scenery of the Seven Churches of Asia Minor. Fisher, Son and Co.
- Broyles, Shawn Christian (2010). Slavery and the Ottoman-Crimean Khanate Connection (PDF) (MA thesis). Oklahoma State University – via shareok.org/bitstream.
- Bulgaru, M. -M. Alexandrescu-Dersca (2010). "49. The role of slaves in the fifteenth-century Turkish Romania". In Bostom, Andrew G. (ed.). The Legacy of Jihad : Islamic Holy War and the Fate of Non-Muslims. Amherst: Prometheus. p. 568. ISBN 978-1-61592-017-4.
- Burford, Robert (1846). Description of a view of Constantinople with its European and Asiatic suburbs and a great extent of surrounding country (PDF). London: T. Brettell (Printer), Rupert Street, Haymarket. p. 5.
- Burke, Peter (2012). "Translating the Turks". Why Concepts Matter: Translating Social and Political Thought. Brill Publishers. pp. 141–152. doi:10.1163/9789004194908_009. ISBN 978-90-04-19490-8.
- Conermann, Stephan; Ağcagül, Sevgi; Şen, Gül (11 May 2020). Slaves and slave agency in the Ottoman Empire. Gottingen: Vandenhoeck & Ruprecht. ISBN 978-3-8470-1037-1. OCLC 1154547774.
- Csukovits, Enikő (2005). "Csodás szabadulások a török rabságból [Miraculous Escapes from Turkish Captivity]". Aetas (in Hungarian). 20 (4). AETAS Könyv- és Lapkiadó Egyesület: 78–90. ISSN 0237-7934.
- Dávid, Géza; Fodor, Pál (2007). Ransom Slavery Along the Ottoman Borders: (Early Fifteenth - Early Eighteenth Centuries). BRILL. ISBN 978-90-04-15704-0.
- Davis, Robert C. (2009-07-01). Holy War and Human Bondage: Tales of Christian-Muslim Slavery in the Early-Modern Mediterranean: Tales of Christian-Muslim Slavery in the Early-Modern Mediterranean. ABC-CLIO. ISBN 978-0-313-06540-8.
- De Busbecq, Ogier Ghislain (2005). Turkish letters. Forster, E. S. (Edward Seymour), 1879-1950. London: Eland. ISBN 978-0-907871-69-9. OCLC 76961364.
- Faroqhi, Suraiya (11 May 2020). "Slave agencies compared: to The Ottoman and Mughal Empires". In Conermann, Stephan; Ağcagül, Sevgi; Şen, Gül (eds.). Slaves and slave agency in the Ottoman Empire. Ottoman studies (Göttingen, Germany). Vol. 7. Gottingen: V&R Unipress. ISBN 9783847010371. OCLC 1154547774.
- Fleet, Kate (2016-05-09). The Extremes of Visibility: Slave Women in Ottoman Public Space (Ottoman Women in Public Space). BRILL. ISBN 978-90-04-31662-1.
- Flemming, Barbara (2018). Essays on Turkish literature and history. Leiden: Brill. p. 362. ISBN 978-90-04-29310-6.
- Hathaway, Jane (2020). The Arab lands under Ottoman rule : 1516-1800 (Second ed.). Abingdon, Oxon: Routledge. ISBN 978-1-003-01507-9. OCLC 1135094891.
- Kovács, Péter E (2009). "Egy magyar rabszolganő Krétán a 15. században [A Hungarian Woman-Slave in Crete in the 15th Century]". In Neumann, Tibor; Rácz, György (eds.). Honoris causa. Tanulmányok Engel Pál tiszteletére (Analecta mediaevalia III) (in Hungarian). PPKE Történettudományi Intézete. pp. 105–123. ISBN 978-963-9627-25-3.
- Kumorovitz, L. Bernát (1983). "I. Lajos királyunk 1375. évi havasalföldi hadjárata (és "török") háborúja [Our King Louis I's Wallachian Campaign and ("Turkish") War of 1375]". Századok (in Hungarian). 117 (5). Magyar Történelmi Társulat: 919–982. ISSN 0039-8098.
- Kuran, T.; Lustig, S. (2012). "Judicial biases in Ottoman Istanbul: Islamic justice and its compatibility with modern economic life". Journal of Law and Economics. 55 (2): 631–666. doi:10.1086/665537. JSTOR 665537. S2CID 222321949.
- MacFarlane, Charles (1829). Constantinople in 1828: A Residence of Sixteen Months in the Turkish Capital and Provinces: with an Account of the Present State of the Naval and Military Power, and of the Resources of the Ottoman Empire. Vol. 1. London: Saunders and Otley.
- Millingen, Alexander Van (2010-10-31). Byzantine Constantinople: The Walls of the City and Adjoining Historical Sites. Cambridge University Press. p. 22. ISBN 978-1-108-01456-4.
- Sarris, Neoklis (1990). Οσμανική πραγματικότητα [Osmanic reality] (in Greek). Vol. 1.s
- Pardoe, Julia S. H. (1845). The city of the sultan; and domestic manners of the Turks, in 1836. Vol. I. Clarke.
- Peirce, Leslie P (1993). The Imperial Harem: Women and Sovereignty in the Ottoman Empire. New York: Oxford University Press. ISBN 978-0-19-507673-8. OCLC 27811454.
- Ruete, Emily (1888). Memoirs of an Arabian Princess . New York: D. Appleton and Company. p. 6 – via Wikisource.
- Stevenson, David (2016). An English Translation of Georgius de Hungaria's Treatise on the Customs, Living Conditions, and Wickedness of the Turks (1481).
- Toledano, Ehud R. (1993). "Shemsigul: A Circassian Slave in Mid-Nineteenth-Century Cairo". Struggle and survival in the modern Middle East. London: I.B. Tauris. ISBN 978-1-85043-607-2.
- Toledano, Ehud R. (1998). Slavery and abolition in the Ottoman Middle East. University of Washington Press. ISBN 978-0-295-97642-6.
- Toledano, Ehud R. (2014). Shifting Patterns Of Ottoman Enslavement in Early Modern Period (The Ottoman Middle East: studies in honor of Amnon Cohen Editors). Cohen, Amnon, 1936-, Editors: Ginio, Eyal; Podeh, Elie. Leiden: Brill. pp. 201 to 220. ISBN 978-90-04-26296-6. OCLC 869281895.
- Von Schierbrand, Wolf (March 28, 1886). "Slaves sold to the Turk; How the vile traffic is still carried on in the East. Sights our correspondent saw for twenty dollars--in the house of a grand old Turk of a dealer" (PDF). The New York Times.
- Walsh, Robert (1836). A Residence at Constantinople: During a Period Including the Commencement, Progress, and Termination of the Greek and Turkish Revolutions. Vol. 2. London: F. Westley & A.H. Davis.
- White, Joshua (2012-01-01). "Catch and Release: Piracy, Slavery, and Law in the Early Modern Ottoman Mediterranean".
- White, Joshua M.; Şen, Gül (2020-05-11). "Slavery, Manumission and freedom suits in early modern Ottoman Empire". Slaves and Slave Agency in the Ottoman Empire. Vandenhoeck & Ruprecht. ISBN 978-3-8470-1037-1.
- Zilfi, Madeline C. (1997). Women in the Ottoman Empire: Middle Eastern Women in the Early Modern Era. BRILL. ISBN 978-90-04-10804-2.
- Zilfi, Madeline (2010-03-22). Women and Slavery in the Late Ottoman Empire: The Design of Difference. Cambridge University Press. ISBN 978-0-521-51583-2. ".. Female slaves .. were legally vulnerable to involuntary sexual use. .. Their second disadvantage as sexual beings were uniquely theirs .. from the moment of capture were legally subject to the disposition of male captors... (p.p.197-198)..female slaves were personal property of their masters. Unlike males, however, every female slave of whatever age or provenance by whatever label was also her master's sexual property. Women had no right of refusal or appeal with regard to their sexuality, although the law forbade owners to use women for outright prostitution. The notional, if not the legal, line between prostitution and the selling of a female slave to another male, who might sell her to yet another was whisper thin. ..p205"
