= Vermes (disambiguation) =

Vermes is an obsolete taxon for non-arthropod invertebrates.

Vermes may also refer to:

== People ==
- Albán Vermes (born 1957), Hungarian swimmer
- Géza Vermes (1924-2013), British religious scholar
- Krisztián Vermes (born 1985), Hungarian footballer
- Peter Vermes (born 1966), American soccer player and coach
- Timur Vermes (born 1967), German writer.

== Places ==
- Vermeș, commune in Caraș-Severin County, Romania
- Vermes, Switzerland, municipality in Delémont
- Vermeș, village in Lechința commune, Bistrița-Năsăud County, Romania
