= Johann Schiltberger =

German traveller and writer (1380 – c. 1440)

Johann (Hans) Schiltberger (1380 – c. 1440) was a German traveller and writer. He was born of a noble family, probably at Hollern near Lohhof halfway between Munich and Freising.

== Travels ==
Schiltberger joined the suite of Lienhart Richartinger in 1394, and he then went to fight under Sigismund, King of Hungary (afterwards Holy Roman Emperor), against the Ottoman Empire on the Hungarian frontier. At the Battle of Nicopolis on 28 September 1396, he was wounded and taken prisoner; when Schiltberger had recovered the use of his feet, Sultan Bayezid I (Yıldırım) took him into his service as a runner (1396–1402). He was factually a military slave for over twenty years. During this time of enslavement he seems to have accompanied Ottoman troops to certain parts of Asia Minor and to Egypt.

On Bayezid's overthrow at the Battle of Ankara (20 July 1402), Schiltberger passed into the service of Bayezid's conqueror Timur: he now appears to have followed Timur to Samarkand, Armenia and Georgia. After Timur's death (17 February 1405) his German runner first became a slave of Shah Rukh, the ablest of Timur's sons; then of Miran Shah, a brother of Shah Rukh; then of Abu Bekr, a son of Miran Shah, whose camp roamed up and down Armenia.

Schiltberger next accompanied Chekre, a Tatar prince living in Abu Bekr's horde, on an excursion to Siberia, of which name Schiltberger gives us the first clear mention in west European literature. He also probably followed his new master in his attack on the Old Bulgaria of the middle Volga, answering to the modern Kazan and its neighborhood. Wanderings in the steppe lands of south-east Russia; visits to Sarai, the old capital of the Kipchak Khanate on the lower Volga and to Azov or Tana, still a trading centre for Venetian and Genoese merchants; a fresh change of servitude on Chekre's ruin; travels in the Crimea, Circassia, Abkhazia and Mingrelia; and finally escape (from the neighborhood of Batum) followed.

Arriving at Constantinople, Schiltberger stayed in hiding there for a time; he then returned to his Bavarian home (1427) by way of Kilia, Akkerman, Lemberg, Kraków, Breslau and Meissen. After his return he became a chamberlain of Duke Albert III, probably receiving this appointment in the first instance before the duke's accession in 1438. The date of his death is unknown, but sources give tentatively suggest he died around 1440.

== Writings ==
Schiltberger's Reisebuch contains not only a record of his own experiences and a sketch of various chapters of contemporary Eastern history, but also an account of countries and their manners and customs, especially of those countries which he had himself visited. First come the lands "this side" of the Danube, where he had travelled; next follow those between the Danube and the sea, which had now fallen under the Turk; after this, the Ottoman dominions in Asia; last come the more distant regions of Schiltberger's world, from Trebizond to Russia and from Egypt to India. In this regional geography the descriptions of Brusa; of various west Caucasian and Armenian regions; of the regions around the Caspian, and the habits of their peoples (especially the Red Tatars); of Siberia; of the Crimea with its great Genoese colony at Kaffa (where he once spent five months); and of Egypt and Arabia, are particularly worth notice. His allusions to the Catholic missions still persisting in Armenia and in other regions beyond the Black Sea, and to (non-Roman ?) Christian communities even in the Great Tatary of the steppes are also remarkable.

Schiltberger is perhaps the first writer of Western Christendom to give the true burial place of Muhammad at Medina: his sketches of Islam and of Eastern Christendom, with all their shortcomings, are of remarkable merit for their time: and he may fairly be reckoned among the authors who contributed to fix Prester John, at the close of the Middle Ages, in Abyssinia. Schiltberger also recorded one of the first European sightings of Przewalski horses. (Manuscript in the Munich Municipal Library, Sign. 1603, Bl. 210). His work, however, contains many inaccuracies; thus in reckoning the years of his service both with Bayezid and with Timur he is off unaccountably in multiples of two.

His account of Timur and his campaigns is misty, often incorrect, and sometimes fabulous: nor can von Hammer's parallel between Marco Polo and Schiltberger be sustained without large reservations. Four manuscripts of the Reisebuch exist: (i) at Donaueschingen in the Fürstenberg Library, No. 481; (2) at Heidelberg, University Library, 216; (3) at Nuremberg, City Library, 34; (4) at St Gall, Monast. Library, 628 (all of fifteenth century, the last fragmentary).

The work was first edited at Augsburg, about 1460; four other editions appeared in the 15th century, and six in the 16th; in the 19th the best were K. F. Neumann's (Munich, 1859), P. Bruun's (Odessa, 1866, with Russian commentary, in the Records of the Imperial University of New Russia, vol. i.), and V. Langmantel's (Tübingen, 1885); "Hans Schiltbergers Reisebuch," in the 172nd volume of the Bibliothek des literarischen Vereins in Stuttgart. See also the English (Hakluyt Society) version, The Bondage and Travels of Johann Schiltberger ..., trans. by Buchan Telfer with notes by P. Bruun (London, 1879); Joseph von Hammer-Purgstall, "Berechtigung d. orientalischen Namen Schiltbergers," in Denkschriften d. Konigl. Akad. d. Wissenschaften (vol. ix., Munich, 1823–1824); R. Röhricht, Bibliotheca geographica Palaestinae (Berlin, 1890, pp. 103–104); C. R. Beazley, Dawn of Modern Geography, iii. 356–378, 550, 555.

== See also ==
- Konstantin Mihailović (born in 1430) Escapee slave of the Ottoman Empire who wrote slave narratives
- George of Hungary (c. 1422–1502) Escapee slave of the Ottoman Empire who wrote slave narratives
- Emily Ruete (1844–1924), author who wrote narrative about slave mother's captivity.

== Bibliography ==
- Christian Slaves of the Ottoman Empire: An analysis of the fifteenth-century captive lives and writings of Konstantin Mihailović, Johan Schiltberger and Brother George of Mühlenbach ~ Patrick Smith (BA Honours) La Trobe University Victoria, Australia August 2020
