= Konstantin Mihailović =

15th century Serbian soldier and memoirist

- Константин Михаиловић
- Born: 1430
- Died: 1500 (aged 69–70); Kingdom of Poland
- Other name: Constantine of Ostrovica
- Military career
- Known for: Memoirs of a Janissary

Konstantin Mihailović, also known as Constantine of Ostrovica, (1430–1500), was a Serbian soldier and author of a memoir of his time as a Janissary in the army of the Ottoman Empire. Mihailović was born in the village of Ostrovica, near Rudnik in the Serbian Despotate. His book, Memoirs of a Janissary (Serbian: Успомене јаничара) was written at the end of the 15th century, probably between 1490 and 1501, and provides a unique insight into life in the Ottoman Army of the time. Mihailović's stated motivation in writing the book was to provide a detailed account of the Ottoman state and its military structure in order to assist the Christian powers in their struggle against the Ottomans.

== Memoirs ==
His memoirs give no insight into his early life. Instead, they begin in 1455, when an army under the command of Sultan Mehmed II laid siege to the castle of Novo Brdo for forty days. The Ottoman Army had marched from Edirne via Sofia in a campaign to establish certain control over the area that is now Kosovo. At the time, Novo Brdo was a rich mining city for silver. The garrison surrendered on June 1, 1455. According to Mihailović, the Sultan stood at the small gate of the castle and sorted the boys from the girls. He then sorted the women on one side of a ditch, and the men on the other. He then ordered all men of any distinguished rank or importance decapitated. The young women and girls, some 700 of them, were taken and given to soldiers and Ottoman commanders.

Following this, the young boys, some 320 of them including Mihailović and his two brothers, were taken to be trained as members of the janissaries. He wrote later that he and nineteen other boys ran away during the night near a village called Samokovo, only to be recaptured, bound, and beaten. He writes that one year later he was present at the Siege of Belgrade. While it is likely that he was present, he had not been with the Ottomans long enough to have become a janissary by that time. Mihailović goes into great detail about that siege and the events that followed.

=== Campaign against Vlad III and in Bosnia ===
After completing his janissary training, he next serves with the Ottoman Army during its advance against Vlad III of Wallachia, who would later be the inspiration for the novel Dracula by Bram Stoker. In this segment, Mihailović confirms the use of impalement by Vlad III, and adds the fact that Vlad III often cut off the noses of Ottoman soldiers and sent them to Hungary to show the number of enemy soldiers he had killed. He states that in one battle, while the Ottomans were crossing the Danube, some 250 janissaries were killed by the Wallachians, but the sheer numbers of the Ottoman force eventually drove Vlad III's forces away.

He also records that during the night the Ottomans were most fearful of Wallachian attack, and that they protected their camps with wooden stakes. This still did not prevent attacks, and they lost thousands of soldiers, as well camels and horses. He gives some mention of the "forest of the impaled" that has since become legend, but also spares details. It is possible Mihailović, being in the rear of the army, did not directly witness it.

His next writings were about the campaign to take Bosnia in 1463. He details the sieges involved in that campaign, and as it comes to a close he and a garrison of janissaries are left to hold the Zvečaj Castle. By this time he seems to have had a considerable rank. His force was not able to withstand a siege led by Matthias Corvinus of Hungary, and Mihailović was one of the prisoners taken. After his identity and ethnicity was discovered, he was repatriated back to his own country.

== Works and publications ==
- Mihailović, Konstantin (1865) [1490—1501], Turska istorija ili kronika (Турска историја или кроника (Memoirs af a Janissary)) (in Serbian), vol. 18, Glasnik Srpskoga učenog društva (Herald of the Serbian Learned Society)

== See also ==
- Johann (Hans) Schiltberger (1380 – c. 1440) Escapee slave of the Ottoman Empire who wrote slave narratives
- George of Hungary (c. 1422–1502) Escapee slave of the Ottoman Empire who wrote slave narratives
- Emily Ruete, author who wrote narrative about slave mother's captivity.
- Teodosije the Hilandarian (1246-1328), one of the most important Serbian writers in the Middle Ages
- Elder Grigorije (fl. 1310–1355), builder of Saint Archangels Monastery
- Antonije Bagaš (fl. 1356–1366), bought and restored the Agiou Pavlou monastery
- Lazar the Hilandarian (fl. 1404), the first known Serbian and Russian watchmaker
- Pachomius the Serb (fl. 1440s-1484), hagiographer of the Russian Church

== Bibliography ==
- Smith, Patrick (2020). Christian Slaves of the Ottoman Empire: An analysis of the fifteenth-century captive lives and writings of Konstantin Mihailović, Johan Schiltberger and Brother George of Mühlenbach (Thesis).
