= George of Hungary =

Ottoman escapee slave

George of Hungary (c. 1422–1502) was a Christian Hungarian who was forced as an Ottoman slave that escaped and reverted from Islam to Christianity, writing afterwards about his experiences. As per description, when George was 15 or 16, he was taken prisoner and sold into slavery when the Ottoman Turks invaded the town of Szászsebes (German: Mühlbach, now Sebeș, Romania) in 1438 during the Transylvanian campaign against the Kingdom of Hungary. George had arrived to the city a year earlier, probably to go to a school in the local Dominican monastery.

He would spend 20 years being a slave before he could escape, later becoming a monk in Rome. Here, he wrote a record of his experiences Tractatus de moribus, condicionibus et nequitia Turcorum ("Treatise on the morals, customs and treachery of the Turks"), published in 1481 in Latin. In 1529 it was translated into German and published along with a preface by Martin Luther. His work is considered one of the most important contemporary sources on the Ottoman Empire, providing detailed accounts of its customs, religion, social practices, and sects with exceptional accuracy for the period.

The ethnicity of George is not known, possibly being either a German or a Hungarian. It is thought that he grew up in a bilingual environment and did not have a clear concept of his national identity. After his escape from the Ottomans, George condemned Islam.

== See also ==
- Konstantin Mihailović (born in 1430), escapee slave of the Ottoman Empire who wrote slave narratives
- Johann (Hans) Schiltberger (1380 – c. 1440), escapee slave of the Ottoman Empire who wrote slave narratives
- Emily Ruete, author who wrote narrative about slave mother's captivity.
- Ex-Muslims
- List of former Muslims
- Margaret Himfi
- Lovisa von Burghausen

== Bibliography ==
- An English Translation of Georgius de Hungaria's Treatise on the Customs, Living Conditions, and Wickedness of the Turks (1481) ~ Stevenson, David Ryan (2016) etd.library.emory.edu
- Babinger, Franz (1978). Mehmed the Conqueror and His Time. Princeton University Press. ISBN 0-691-09900-6.
- Christian Slaves of the Ottoman Empire: An analysis of the fifteenth-century captive lives and writings of Konstantin Mihailović, Johan Schiltberger and Brother George of Mühlenbach ~ Patrick Smith (BA Honours) La Trobe University Victoria, Australia August 2020.
- Classen, A. (2023). Georgius of Hungary’s Report about His Enslavement in Light of the Manuscript and Print Tradition. Journal of the Early Book Society, 26, 185–194.
- Williams, Stephen Christopher (1991) "Cronica der Turckey" Sebastian Franck's Translation of the "Tractatus de Moribus, Condicionibus et Nequitia Turcorum" by Georgius de Hungaria. PhD thesis, University of Leeds.
- Christian-Muslim Relations. A Bibliographical History. Volume 7 Central and Eastern Europe, Asia, Africa and South America (1500–1600): Volume 7. Central and Eastern Europe, Asia, Africa and South America (1500–1600). Netherlands, Brill, 2015.
