= Leonhard Reichartinger =

Leonhardreichartinger

Leonhard Reichartinger (?? – 25 September 1396) was a Crusader of Bavarian nobility, who may have come from the vicinity of Trostberg. Reichartinger participated in one of the last great crusades of the Middle Ages, the Battle of Nicopolis. The Nicopolis Crusade was ordered by Sigismund, King of Hungary and later Holy Roman Emperor, against the Ottoman sultan Bayezid I. Reichartinger was killed in the battle. His death is mentioned in Johann Schiltberger's account of the battle.
