= Wolf Curt von Schierbrand =

German zoologist (1807–1888)

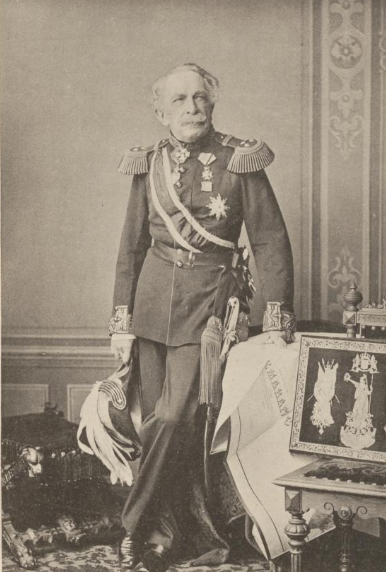
Dutch Royal Lieutenant General Wolf Curt von Schierbrand around 1867

Wolf Curt von Schierbrand (31 January 1807 – 20 February 1888) was a German zoological scientist and member of the Academy of Sciences Leopoldina. His report of his travels in Java, originally prepared in manuscript for family and friends, was published posthumously in 1888 in an edition edited by A. Schöne.

== Selected publications ==
- Reisebericht aus Java a. d. J. 1825–1826, [von] Wolf C. von Schierbrand. Für die Familie und die Freunde als Manuscript. (Travel report from Java to J. 1825–1826, [by] Wolf C. von Schierbrand. For the family and friends as Manuscript) Königsberg, Hartungsche Buchdr., 1888. Edited by A. Schöne.
