= Margaret Himfi =

- Born: before 1380
- Died: after 1408
- Noble family: House of Himfi
- Master: Giorgio Darvasio
- Issue: Marieta; Iacoba
- Father: Benedict Himfi
- Mother: Dorothea Essegvári

Margaret Himfi de Döbrönte (Hungarian: döbröntei Himfi Margit; died after 1408) was a Hungarian noblewoman at the turn of the 14th and 15th centuries, who was abducted and enslaved by Ottoman marauders. She later became a slave mistress of a wealthy Venetian citizen of Crete, with whom she had two daughters. Margaret was able to return to Hungary in 1405.

== Family background ==
Margaret was born into the Döbrönte branch of the influential Himfi noble family. Her father Benedict Himfi governed the Hungarian-occupied Vidin and the surrounding areas as Ban of Bulgaria from 1366 to 1369. Her mother was Dorothea Essegvári, whose family originated from the Lőrinte kindred. Margaret's exact date of birth is unknown but her father died in October 1380. She also had a brother Nicholas, a courtly knight. After becoming a widow, Dorothea joined the Saint Catherine's Monastery of Veszprém in 1385 and adopted the name of Margaret. According to Benedict's last will and testament, the family estates laid mostly in Temes County where he formerly also served as ispán (count).

== Abduction and slavery ==
During one of the first Ottoman incursions at the borderland of the Kingdom of Hungary, Margaret was abducted from the family seat, the village of Egerszeg in Temes County (today part of Vermeș in Romania). The exact date of the event is indeterminable. Premonstratensian monk and historian L. Bernát Kumorovitz connected the abduction with King Louis I's 1375 campaign against Wallachia which entered into alliance with the Ottoman Empire during the rule of Vladislav I. Margaret's father Benedict compiled his last testament in the next year as intended to pilgrimage to the Holy Land, alongside Voivode Stephen Lackfi. Kumorovitz claimed Benedict started to journey to East to search his abducted daughter. During their pilgrimage, Lackfi also negotiated with Robert de Juilly, Grand Master of the Knights Hospitaller in Rhodes over Hungarian estate matters, and Kumorovitz argued the Knights Hospitaller were also involved in the search inquiry.

As Margaret was only found by 1405 and she had two underage children, historian Pál Engel considered 1375 as date of the abduction is too early, as it would be difficult to believe that she was still being searched for thirty years later, and she could not have minor daughters still in 1408. As a result, Engel set 1391 or 1392 as the year of the kidnapping. Péter E. Kovács highlighted Benedict Himfi has been granted permission to journey to the Holy Land already on 27 June 1375, when the Wallachian campaign was still happening. As Margaret has not forgotten her origin, kinship and native language, the date of 1391–92 is more acceptable, as she had to be more than eleven years old during the abduction (Benedict died in 1380), but she could have still minor children in 1405. E. Kovács argued it is also possible that Margaret was abducted and enslaved by Ottoman marauders during a small skirmish, and not during a large-scale campaign. Historian Enikő Csukovits also considered 1391 or 1392 as the year of the event.

Sometimes before 1405, Margaret was sold to Crete which then was overseas colony of the Republic of Venice under the name Kingdom of Candia. She became a slave mistress of a wealthy citizen, Giorgio Darvasio, who came from a Venetian merchant family. His father Marco already settled down on Crete, while his mother Ysabeta signed her last testament in Venice in 1416. It is plausible that Giorgio was born on Crete and inherited a large fortune from his father. He had strong business ties with the powerful Mocenigo family (when Margaret still resided on Crete, Tommaso Mocenigo, who later became doge, ruled the island as Duke of Candia). Margaret had two daughters from her slave master; Marieta and Iacoba, who were still minors in 1405 and even in 1408. According to that charter which narrated Margaret's story, the lady was well treated by her slave master. Thus he was possibly attached to her emotionally.

== Return to Hungary ==
Despite her relative good fate in Darvasio's estate, Margaret never gave up her intention to return to Hungary. On 1 July 1405, a charter was issued on Crete in the case of the noblewoman. Accordingly, Nicholas Marcali, a former Voivode of Transylvania personally arrived to the island in order to liberate Margaret. Darvasio agreed to release her without any ransom and also took an escort for her mistress. Initially he wanted one of their daughters to stay on Crete, but later his only condition was occasional visit opportunity to Hungary to see her former slave and their two children. As Marcali was not a relative of the Himfi family, it is uncertain why he was chosen to go for Margaret. As he failed to take the noblewoman back to home after the arrangement, it is probable he may have been asked because he intended to travel with some other purpose, for instance Christian pilgrimage or diplomatic mission. In addition, Marcali was regarded as one of the Hungarian barons, thus he could be more influential during the conclusion of the contract than a lesser nobleman. In the charter, Marcali expressed his intention to return to Crete for Margaret and the two children.

Marcali's mission proved that Margaret finally was able to contact with her kinship in Hungary, and her memory has preserved at home by that year. As she was a slave, there was no need for requesting authorization from the Venetian authority which regulated the free travel of islanders on Crete. Darvasio transferred Margaret and their daughters to Venice in order to travel to Hungary. There he hand them over to Margaret's alleged brother-in-law John of Redel, and also covered her travel expenses. As there is no record of such relative with that name in the genealogical data, it is possible she was conned and robbed during the journey. Nevertheless, Margaret was able to return to Hungary after lengthy years and resided in Buda with her children. On 1 July 1408, Darvasio turned to the Great Council of Venice to complain that neither Nicholas Marcali nor John of Redel had been reimbursed for Margaret's travel expenses. The Council forwarded the message to Sigismund, King of Hungary and asked for his intervention.

On 10 November 1408, Francesco Bernardi, a Florentine-origin burgher responded a letter to his unidentified friend, who wrote to him on 21 August. According to this, Margaret, who spoke better in Italian than Hungarian, was a regular guest in his house at Buda, the Hungarian capital. As an esteemed member of the Italian community in Hungary, Bernardi received Darvasio's demands and promised his intercession to the royal court. According to him, his "late friend", Benedict Himfi had commissioned Bernardi to send 200 gold to Padua in 1373, but before her arrival, he did not know Margaret's fate. Bernardi served as ispán to collect thirtieth (Hungarian: harmincadispán) in the 1390s. Though he was arrested and a large portion of his assets was confiscated in 1402, to the pressure of the German community, he retained his influence at the royal court and the Hungarian nobility. In his letter, Bernardi stated he supports financially Margaret Himfi and also reassured Darvasio through his unidentified friend that the Himfis – namely Benedict II, son of Nicholas I, her late brother and Stephen from the Remete branch – took care of the woman. He called Margaret as "trustworthy" and "patient", "and [she is] not at all frivolous". According to the letter, Margaret spoke of her former slave master with the greatest respect. Bernardi confirmed Marcali has not met yet Margaret at the time of writing the letter, and she "is waiting for him". He added, Marcali probably will not help her when he arrives to Buda, because he is a "typical Hungarian". He argued the Hungarian lord made a mistake when helped Margaret to return to Hungary, because those women who were abducted and enslaved before becoming concubines in such circumstances, were considered as a shame for the female kinship in Hungary. Bernardi promised he will adopt Marieta and Iacoba as his legitimate children, if Marcali or the Himfis refuse to take care Margaret and her minor daughters hereinafter. Bernardi's letter was the last information about Margaret.

After her return to Hungary, Darvasio left Crete for Venice. There lying on his deathbed, he made his last will and testament on 20 February 1413. According to his intention, one of his freed Tatar slaves and mistresses was supposed to inherit 10 ducat and several fabrics, while another concubine received 20 ducats to "raise her children" who were probably fathered by Darvasio himself. He did not mention Margaret and their two daughters in his last will. He was buried at the Scuola di Santa Maria della Misericordia.

== See also ==
- Slavery in the Ottoman Empire

== Sources ==
- Csukovits, Enikő (2005). "Csodás szabadulások a török rabságból [Miraculous Escapes from Turkish Captivity]". Aetas (in Hungarian). 20 (4). AETAS Könyv- és Lapkiadó Egyesület: 78–90. ISSN 0237-7934.
- E. Kovács, Péter (2009). "Egy magyar rabszolganő Krétán a 15. században [A Hungarian Woman-Slave in Crete in the 15th Century]". In Neumann, Tibor; Rácz, György (eds.). Honoris causa. Tanulmányok Engel Pál tiszteletére (Analecta mediaevalia III) (in Hungarian). PPKE Történettudományi Intézete. pp. 105–123. ISBN 978-963-9627-25-3.
- Engel, Pál (1998). "A török-magyar háborúk első évei, 1389–1392 [The First Years of the Ottoman–Hungarian Wars, 1389–1392]". Hadtörténelmi Közlemények (in Hungarian). 111 (3). Hadtörténeti Intézet és Múzeum: 555–577. ISSN 0017-6540.
- Horváth, Richárd (2010). "Bigámista volt-e Himfi Benedek bolgár bán? Adalékok a Döbrentei Himfiek családi történetéhez [Was Benedict Himfi, Ban of Bulgaria a Bigamous? Details on Family History of the Himfis de Döbrente]". Turul (in Hungarian). 83 (4): 116–118. ISSN 1216-7258.
- Kumorovitz, L. Bernát (1983). "I. Lajos királyunk 1375. évi havasalföldi hadjárata (és "török") háborúja [Our King Louis I's Wallachian Campaign and ("Turkish") War of 1375]". Századok (in Hungarian). 117 (5). Magyar Történelmi Társulat: 919–982. ISSN 0039-8098.
