= Vermeș =

- Commune
- Coat of arms

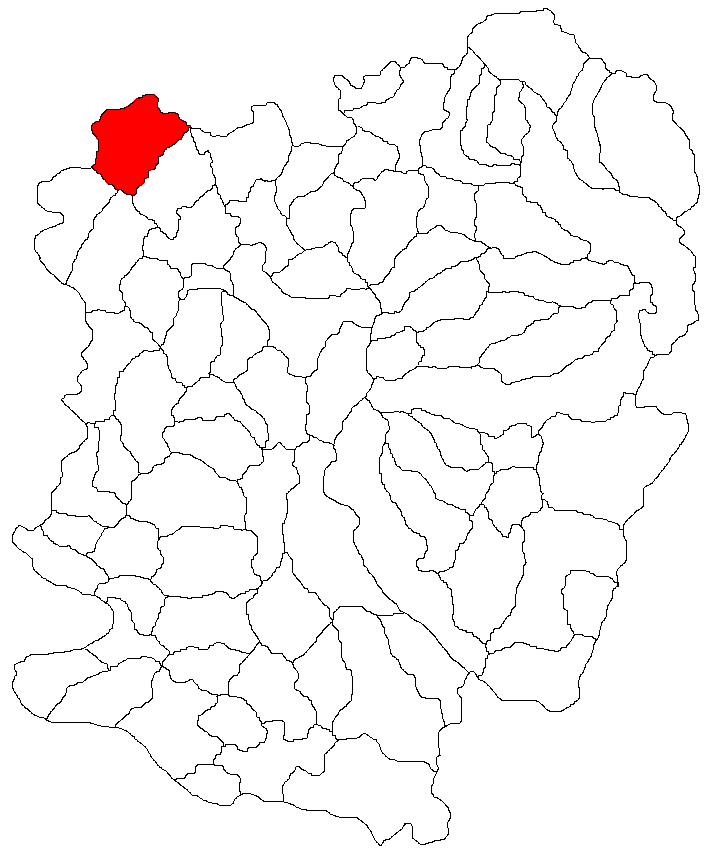
- Location in Caraș-Severin County

- Location in Romania
- Coordinates: 45°31′N 21°39′E
- Country: Romania
- County: Caraș-Severin

Government
  - Mayor (2024–2028): Ion-Iacob Damian (PSD)
- Area: 114.56 km^{2} (44.23 sq mi)
- Elevation: 135 m (443 ft)
- Population (2021-12-01): 1,438
  - Density: 12.55/km^{2} (32.51/sq mi)
- Time zone: UTC+02:00 (EET)
  - Summer (DST): UTC+03:00 (EEST)
- Postal code: 327425
- Area code: (+40) 02 55
- Vehicle reg.: CS
- Website: www.vermes.ro

Vermeș (Hungarian: Krassóvermes) is a commune in Caraș-Severin County, western Romania with a population of 1,438 as of 2021. It is composed of three villages: Ersig (Érszeg), Izgar (Izgár), and Vermeș.
